

593001–593100 

|-bgcolor=#E9E9E9
| 593001 ||  || — || February 16, 2015 || Haleakala || Pan-STARRS ||  || align=right | 1.2 km || 
|-id=002 bgcolor=#E9E9E9
| 593002 ||  || — || October 8, 2008 || Mount Lemmon || Mount Lemmon Survey ||  || align=right | 1.3 km || 
|-id=003 bgcolor=#E9E9E9
| 593003 ||  || — || October 31, 2013 || Mount Lemmon || Mount Lemmon Survey ||  || align=right data-sort-value="0.77" | 770 m || 
|-id=004 bgcolor=#fefefe
| 593004 ||  || — || February 23, 2007 || Kitt Peak || Spacewatch ||  || align=right data-sort-value="0.91" | 910 m || 
|-id=005 bgcolor=#E9E9E9
| 593005 ||  || — || March 22, 2015 || Haleakala || Pan-STARRS ||  || align=right | 1.7 km || 
|-id=006 bgcolor=#E9E9E9
| 593006 ||  || — || January 23, 2015 || Haleakala || Pan-STARRS ||  || align=right | 1.5 km || 
|-id=007 bgcolor=#E9E9E9
| 593007 ||  || — || June 17, 2012 || Kitt Peak || Spacewatch ||  || align=right | 1.1 km || 
|-id=008 bgcolor=#E9E9E9
| 593008 ||  || — || December 3, 2013 || Haleakala || Pan-STARRS ||  || align=right | 1.4 km || 
|-id=009 bgcolor=#E9E9E9
| 593009 ||  || — || January 10, 2010 || Kitt Peak || Spacewatch ||  || align=right | 1.5 km || 
|-id=010 bgcolor=#E9E9E9
| 593010 ||  || — || March 22, 2015 || Haleakala || Pan-STARRS ||  || align=right data-sort-value="0.89" | 890 m || 
|-id=011 bgcolor=#E9E9E9
| 593011 ||  || — || September 27, 2003 || Kitt Peak || Spacewatch ||  || align=right | 1.8 km || 
|-id=012 bgcolor=#E9E9E9
| 593012 ||  || — || February 22, 2015 || Haleakala || Pan-STARRS ||  || align=right | 1.5 km || 
|-id=013 bgcolor=#E9E9E9
| 593013 ||  || — || February 25, 2015 || Haleakala || Pan-STARRS ||  || align=right | 1.7 km || 
|-id=014 bgcolor=#E9E9E9
| 593014 ||  || — || February 16, 2015 || Haleakala || Pan-STARRS ||  || align=right | 1.6 km || 
|-id=015 bgcolor=#E9E9E9
| 593015 ||  || — || November 6, 2013 || Haleakala || Pan-STARRS ||  || align=right data-sort-value="0.83" | 830 m || 
|-id=016 bgcolor=#fefefe
| 593016 ||  || — || August 28, 2013 || Catalina || CSS ||  || align=right | 1.0 km || 
|-id=017 bgcolor=#E9E9E9
| 593017 ||  || — || October 2, 2008 || Kitt Peak || Spacewatch ||  || align=right | 1.3 km || 
|-id=018 bgcolor=#E9E9E9
| 593018 ||  || — || January 31, 2006 || Kitt Peak || Spacewatch ||  || align=right | 1.2 km || 
|-id=019 bgcolor=#E9E9E9
| 593019 ||  || — || April 26, 2007 || Mount Lemmon || Mount Lemmon Survey ||  || align=right data-sort-value="0.98" | 980 m || 
|-id=020 bgcolor=#C2FFFF
| 593020 ||  || — || October 17, 2010 || Mount Lemmon || Mount Lemmon Survey || L4 || align=right | 7.1 km || 
|-id=021 bgcolor=#fefefe
| 593021 ||  || — || October 23, 2003 || Apache Point || SDSS Collaboration || H || align=right data-sort-value="0.61" | 610 m || 
|-id=022 bgcolor=#E9E9E9
| 593022 ||  || — || August 15, 2004 || Palomar || NEAT ||  || align=right | 1.4 km || 
|-id=023 bgcolor=#E9E9E9
| 593023 ||  || — || April 29, 2006 || Siding Spring || SSS ||  || align=right | 2.7 km || 
|-id=024 bgcolor=#E9E9E9
| 593024 ||  || — || August 12, 2004 || Cerro Tololo || Cerro Tololo Obs. ||  || align=right data-sort-value="0.99" | 990 m || 
|-id=025 bgcolor=#E9E9E9
| 593025 ||  || — || January 23, 2015 || Haleakala || Pan-STARRS ||  || align=right | 1.2 km || 
|-id=026 bgcolor=#E9E9E9
| 593026 ||  || — || May 3, 2011 || Mount Lemmon || Mount Lemmon Survey ||  || align=right | 1.4 km || 
|-id=027 bgcolor=#E9E9E9
| 593027 ||  || — || April 4, 2011 || Kitt Peak || Spacewatch ||  || align=right | 1.4 km || 
|-id=028 bgcolor=#E9E9E9
| 593028 ||  || — || September 14, 2012 || Catalina || CSS ||  || align=right | 1.4 km || 
|-id=029 bgcolor=#E9E9E9
| 593029 ||  || — || October 6, 2008 || Kitt Peak || Spacewatch ||  || align=right | 1.3 km || 
|-id=030 bgcolor=#E9E9E9
| 593030 ||  || — || April 6, 2011 || Mount Lemmon || Mount Lemmon Survey ||  || align=right | 1.4 km || 
|-id=031 bgcolor=#E9E9E9
| 593031 ||  || — || January 21, 2015 || Haleakala || Pan-STARRS ||  || align=right | 2.0 km || 
|-id=032 bgcolor=#E9E9E9
| 593032 ||  || — || January 23, 2015 || Haleakala || Pan-STARRS ||  || align=right data-sort-value="0.81" | 810 m || 
|-id=033 bgcolor=#E9E9E9
| 593033 ||  || — || November 10, 2004 || Kitt Peak || Spacewatch ||  || align=right | 1.5 km || 
|-id=034 bgcolor=#C2FFFF
| 593034 ||  || — || November 13, 2010 || Pla D'Arguines || R. Ferrando, M. Ferrando || L4 || align=right | 6.8 km || 
|-id=035 bgcolor=#E9E9E9
| 593035 ||  || — || December 25, 2005 || Kitt Peak || Spacewatch ||  || align=right | 1.3 km || 
|-id=036 bgcolor=#E9E9E9
| 593036 ||  || — || April 22, 2007 || Mount Lemmon || Mount Lemmon Survey ||  || align=right | 1.4 km || 
|-id=037 bgcolor=#E9E9E9
| 593037 ||  || — || September 6, 2008 || Catalina || CSS ||  || align=right | 1.0 km || 
|-id=038 bgcolor=#E9E9E9
| 593038 ||  || — || October 25, 2013 || Mount Lemmon || Mount Lemmon Survey ||  || align=right | 1.6 km || 
|-id=039 bgcolor=#E9E9E9
| 593039 ||  || — || April 9, 2002 || Kitt Peak || Spacewatch ||  || align=right | 1.4 km || 
|-id=040 bgcolor=#E9E9E9
| 593040 ||  || — || November 24, 2009 || Kitt Peak || Spacewatch ||  || align=right | 1.0 km || 
|-id=041 bgcolor=#E9E9E9
| 593041 ||  || — || January 21, 2015 || Haleakala || Pan-STARRS ||  || align=right | 1.5 km || 
|-id=042 bgcolor=#E9E9E9
| 593042 ||  || — || April 14, 2011 || Mount Lemmon || Mount Lemmon Survey ||  || align=right | 1.4 km || 
|-id=043 bgcolor=#E9E9E9
| 593043 ||  || — || September 22, 2008 || Kitt Peak || Spacewatch ||  || align=right | 1.2 km || 
|-id=044 bgcolor=#E9E9E9
| 593044 ||  || — || February 18, 2015 || Haleakala || Pan-STARRS ||  || align=right | 1.6 km || 
|-id=045 bgcolor=#E9E9E9
| 593045 ||  || — || February 17, 2015 || Haleakala || Pan-STARRS ||  || align=right | 1.7 km || 
|-id=046 bgcolor=#E9E9E9
| 593046 ||  || — || March 24, 2015 || Haleakala || Pan-STARRS ||  || align=right | 1.3 km || 
|-id=047 bgcolor=#E9E9E9
| 593047 ||  || — || December 29, 2014 || Haleakala || Pan-STARRS ||  || align=right | 1.4 km || 
|-id=048 bgcolor=#E9E9E9
| 593048 ||  || — || January 19, 2015 || Haleakala || Pan-STARRS ||  || align=right | 1.1 km || 
|-id=049 bgcolor=#E9E9E9
| 593049 ||  || — || April 12, 2011 || Mount Lemmon || Mount Lemmon Survey ||  || align=right | 1.4 km || 
|-id=050 bgcolor=#E9E9E9
| 593050 ||  || — || November 29, 2013 || Mount Lemmon || Mount Lemmon Survey ||  || align=right | 1.4 km || 
|-id=051 bgcolor=#E9E9E9
| 593051 ||  || — || November 26, 2013 || Haleakala || Pan-STARRS ||  || align=right | 1.6 km || 
|-id=052 bgcolor=#fefefe
| 593052 ||  || — || April 26, 2007 || Mount Lemmon || Mount Lemmon Survey || H || align=right data-sort-value="0.41" | 410 m || 
|-id=053 bgcolor=#E9E9E9
| 593053 ||  || — || December 7, 2012 || Haleakala || Pan-STARRS ||  || align=right | 1.8 km || 
|-id=054 bgcolor=#d6d6d6
| 593054 ||  || — || March 28, 2015 || Haleakala || Pan-STARRS ||  || align=right | 2.4 km || 
|-id=055 bgcolor=#fefefe
| 593055 ||  || — || February 27, 2015 || Haleakala || Pan-STARRS || H || align=right data-sort-value="0.48" | 480 m || 
|-id=056 bgcolor=#E9E9E9
| 593056 ||  || — || September 28, 2008 || Mount Lemmon || Mount Lemmon Survey ||  || align=right | 1.4 km || 
|-id=057 bgcolor=#C2FFFF
| 593057 ||  || — || January 17, 2013 || Kitt Peak || Spacewatch || L4 || align=right | 10 km || 
|-id=058 bgcolor=#E9E9E9
| 593058 ||  || — || September 23, 2008 || Mount Lemmon || Mount Lemmon Survey ||  || align=right | 2.5 km || 
|-id=059 bgcolor=#E9E9E9
| 593059 ||  || — || March 23, 2015 || Haleakala || Pan-STARRS ||  || align=right | 1.7 km || 
|-id=060 bgcolor=#E9E9E9
| 593060 ||  || — || August 21, 2004 || Siding Spring || SSS ||  || align=right | 1.2 km || 
|-id=061 bgcolor=#E9E9E9
| 593061 ||  || — || March 25, 2015 || Haleakala || Pan-STARRS ||  || align=right | 1.5 km || 
|-id=062 bgcolor=#E9E9E9
| 593062 ||  || — || March 22, 2015 || Kitt Peak || Spacewatch ||  || align=right | 2.0 km || 
|-id=063 bgcolor=#E9E9E9
| 593063 ||  || — || March 25, 2015 || Haleakala || Pan-STARRS ||  || align=right | 1.7 km || 
|-id=064 bgcolor=#E9E9E9
| 593064 ||  || — || March 25, 2015 || Haleakala || Pan-STARRS ||  || align=right | 1.7 km || 
|-id=065 bgcolor=#E9E9E9
| 593065 ||  || — || February 2, 2006 || Kitt Peak || Spacewatch ||  || align=right | 1.6 km || 
|-id=066 bgcolor=#d6d6d6
| 593066 ||  || — || January 21, 2014 || Mount Lemmon || Mount Lemmon Survey ||  || align=right | 2.0 km || 
|-id=067 bgcolor=#E9E9E9
| 593067 ||  || — || October 9, 2012 || Catalina || CSS ||  || align=right | 2.4 km || 
|-id=068 bgcolor=#E9E9E9
| 593068 ||  || — || March 25, 2015 || Haleakala || Pan-STARRS ||  || align=right | 1.3 km || 
|-id=069 bgcolor=#E9E9E9
| 593069 ||  || — || February 28, 2006 || Mount Lemmon || Mount Lemmon Survey ||  || align=right | 1.9 km || 
|-id=070 bgcolor=#fefefe
| 593070 ||  || — || March 28, 2015 || Haleakala || Pan-STARRS || H || align=right data-sort-value="0.76" | 760 m || 
|-id=071 bgcolor=#fefefe
| 593071 ||  || — || March 27, 2015 || Haleakala || Pan-STARRS || H || align=right data-sort-value="0.71" | 710 m || 
|-id=072 bgcolor=#E9E9E9
| 593072 ||  || — || February 20, 2015 || Haleakala || Pan-STARRS ||  || align=right | 1.8 km || 
|-id=073 bgcolor=#E9E9E9
| 593073 ||  || — || June 23, 1995 || Kitt Peak || Spacewatch ||  || align=right | 1.1 km || 
|-id=074 bgcolor=#fefefe
| 593074 ||  || — || October 24, 2008 || Mount Lemmon || Mount Lemmon Survey || H || align=right data-sort-value="0.72" | 720 m || 
|-id=075 bgcolor=#E9E9E9
| 593075 ||  || — || January 17, 2015 || Haleakala || Pan-STARRS ||  || align=right | 1.4 km || 
|-id=076 bgcolor=#E9E9E9
| 593076 ||  || — || December 17, 2009 || Kitt Peak || Spacewatch ||  || align=right | 1.4 km || 
|-id=077 bgcolor=#E9E9E9
| 593077 ||  || — || March 17, 2015 || Haleakala || Pan-STARRS ||  || align=right | 1.2 km || 
|-id=078 bgcolor=#E9E9E9
| 593078 ||  || — || September 19, 2003 || Kitt Peak || Spacewatch ||  || align=right | 1.8 km || 
|-id=079 bgcolor=#E9E9E9
| 593079 ||  || — || April 19, 2006 || Kitt Peak || Spacewatch ||  || align=right | 1.8 km || 
|-id=080 bgcolor=#C2FFFF
| 593080 ||  || — || November 14, 1998 || Kitt Peak || Spacewatch || L4 || align=right | 8.5 km || 
|-id=081 bgcolor=#E9E9E9
| 593081 ||  || — || March 17, 2015 || Haleakala || Pan-STARRS ||  || align=right data-sort-value="0.88" | 880 m || 
|-id=082 bgcolor=#E9E9E9
| 593082 ||  || — || October 8, 2008 || Kitt Peak || Spacewatch ||  || align=right | 1.8 km || 
|-id=083 bgcolor=#E9E9E9
| 593083 ||  || — || January 18, 2015 || Haleakala || Pan-STARRS ||  || align=right | 1.2 km || 
|-id=084 bgcolor=#E9E9E9
| 593084 ||  || — || January 26, 2015 || Haleakala || Pan-STARRS ||  || align=right | 1.9 km || 
|-id=085 bgcolor=#fefefe
| 593085 ||  || — || January 20, 2015 || Haleakala || Pan-STARRS || H || align=right data-sort-value="0.52" | 520 m || 
|-id=086 bgcolor=#E9E9E9
| 593086 ||  || — || November 9, 2013 || Haleakala || Pan-STARRS ||  || align=right | 1.2 km || 
|-id=087 bgcolor=#C2FFFF
| 593087 ||  || — || January 17, 2013 || Haleakala || Pan-STARRS || L4 || align=right | 7.0 km || 
|-id=088 bgcolor=#C2FFFF
| 593088 ||  || — || July 30, 2008 || Mount Lemmon || Mount Lemmon Survey || L4 || align=right | 8.3 km || 
|-id=089 bgcolor=#d6d6d6
| 593089 ||  || — || September 11, 2007 || Mount Lemmon || Mount Lemmon Survey ||  || align=right | 2.0 km || 
|-id=090 bgcolor=#E9E9E9
| 593090 ||  || — || October 8, 2012 || Haleakala || Pan-STARRS ||  || align=right | 2.0 km || 
|-id=091 bgcolor=#E9E9E9
| 593091 ||  || — || March 20, 2015 || Haleakala || Pan-STARRS ||  || align=right | 1.7 km || 
|-id=092 bgcolor=#E9E9E9
| 593092 ||  || — || January 25, 2006 || Kitt Peak || Spacewatch ||  || align=right | 1.7 km || 
|-id=093 bgcolor=#E9E9E9
| 593093 ||  || — || June 9, 2008 || Kitt Peak || Spacewatch ||  || align=right data-sort-value="0.98" | 980 m || 
|-id=094 bgcolor=#C2FFFF
| 593094 ||  || — || January 22, 2015 || Haleakala || Pan-STARRS || L4 || align=right | 7.6 km || 
|-id=095 bgcolor=#E9E9E9
| 593095 ||  || — || September 23, 2008 || Kitt Peak || Spacewatch ||  || align=right | 1.3 km || 
|-id=096 bgcolor=#E9E9E9
| 593096 ||  || — || October 11, 2012 || Haleakala || Pan-STARRS ||  || align=right | 1.6 km || 
|-id=097 bgcolor=#C2FFFF
| 593097 ||  || — || February 26, 2014 || Mount Lemmon || Mount Lemmon Survey || L4 || align=right | 7.4 km || 
|-id=098 bgcolor=#E9E9E9
| 593098 ||  || — || February 9, 2005 || La Silla || C. Vuissoz, G. Bourban ||  || align=right | 1.8 km || 
|-id=099 bgcolor=#E9E9E9
| 593099 ||  || — || December 18, 2009 || Mount Lemmon || Mount Lemmon Survey ||  || align=right data-sort-value="0.91" | 910 m || 
|-id=100 bgcolor=#E9E9E9
| 593100 ||  || — || January 22, 2015 || Haleakala || Pan-STARRS ||  || align=right | 1.6 km || 
|}

593101–593200 

|-bgcolor=#E9E9E9
| 593101 ||  || — || October 22, 2003 || Apache Point || SDSS Collaboration ||  || align=right | 1.9 km || 
|-id=102 bgcolor=#d6d6d6
| 593102 ||  || — || March 28, 2015 || Haleakala || Pan-STARRS ||  || align=right | 1.9 km || 
|-id=103 bgcolor=#E9E9E9
| 593103 ||  || — || March 17, 2015 || Haleakala || Pan-STARRS ||  || align=right | 1.5 km || 
|-id=104 bgcolor=#fefefe
| 593104 ||  || — || March 28, 2015 || Haleakala || Pan-STARRS || H || align=right data-sort-value="0.54" | 540 m || 
|-id=105 bgcolor=#E9E9E9
| 593105 ||  || — || March 22, 2015 || Haleakala || Pan-STARRS ||  || align=right | 1.6 km || 
|-id=106 bgcolor=#C2FFFF
| 593106 ||  || — || February 24, 2014 || Haleakala || Pan-STARRS || L4 || align=right | 6.5 km || 
|-id=107 bgcolor=#E9E9E9
| 593107 ||  || — || March 17, 2015 || Mount Lemmon || Mount Lemmon Survey ||  || align=right | 1.6 km || 
|-id=108 bgcolor=#E9E9E9
| 593108 ||  || — || March 21, 2015 || Haleakala || Pan-STARRS ||  || align=right | 1.3 km || 
|-id=109 bgcolor=#C2FFFF
| 593109 ||  || — || March 25, 2015 || Haleakala || Pan-STARRS || L4 || align=right | 6.5 km || 
|-id=110 bgcolor=#E9E9E9
| 593110 ||  || — || October 31, 2008 || Kitt Peak || Spacewatch ||  || align=right | 1.5 km || 
|-id=111 bgcolor=#E9E9E9
| 593111 ||  || — || March 22, 2015 || Mount Lemmon || Mount Lemmon Survey ||  || align=right | 1.7 km || 
|-id=112 bgcolor=#d6d6d6
| 593112 ||  || — || March 31, 2015 || Haleakala || Pan-STARRS ||  || align=right | 1.9 km || 
|-id=113 bgcolor=#C2FFFF
| 593113 ||  || — || March 22, 2015 || Haleakala || Pan-STARRS || L4 || align=right | 8.8 km || 
|-id=114 bgcolor=#C2FFFF
| 593114 ||  || — || March 22, 2015 || Mount Lemmon || Mount Lemmon Survey || L4 || align=right | 5.5 km || 
|-id=115 bgcolor=#E9E9E9
| 593115 ||  || — || January 23, 2015 || Haleakala || Pan-STARRS ||  || align=right | 1.5 km || 
|-id=116 bgcolor=#C2FFFF
| 593116 ||  || — || January 10, 2013 || Kitt Peak || Spacewatch || L4 || align=right | 6.6 km || 
|-id=117 bgcolor=#E9E9E9
| 593117 ||  || — || March 22, 2015 || Haleakala || Pan-STARRS ||  || align=right | 1.3 km || 
|-id=118 bgcolor=#d6d6d6
| 593118 ||  || — || March 25, 2015 || Haleakala || Pan-STARRS ||  || align=right | 1.6 km || 
|-id=119 bgcolor=#fefefe
| 593119 ||  || — || August 7, 2005 || Siding Spring || SSS || H || align=right data-sort-value="0.71" | 710 m || 
|-id=120 bgcolor=#E9E9E9
| 593120 ||  || — || January 19, 2015 || Haleakala || Pan-STARRS ||  || align=right | 1.6 km || 
|-id=121 bgcolor=#FA8072
| 593121 ||  || — || December 20, 2014 || Haleakala || Pan-STARRS || H || align=right data-sort-value="0.60" | 600 m || 
|-id=122 bgcolor=#E9E9E9
| 593122 ||  || — || March 27, 2015 || Kitt Peak || Spacewatch ||  || align=right | 1.4 km || 
|-id=123 bgcolor=#d6d6d6
| 593123 ||  || — || October 18, 2012 || Haleakala || Pan-STARRS ||  || align=right | 2.3 km || 
|-id=124 bgcolor=#E9E9E9
| 593124 ||  || — || April 18, 1998 || Kitt Peak || Spacewatch ||  || align=right | 1.5 km || 
|-id=125 bgcolor=#E9E9E9
| 593125 ||  || — || March 17, 2015 || Haleakala || Pan-STARRS ||  || align=right | 1.8 km || 
|-id=126 bgcolor=#E9E9E9
| 593126 ||  || — || August 14, 2012 || Siding Spring || SSS ||  || align=right | 1.8 km || 
|-id=127 bgcolor=#E9E9E9
| 593127 ||  || — || May 1, 2011 || Haleakala || Pan-STARRS ||  || align=right | 1.5 km || 
|-id=128 bgcolor=#E9E9E9
| 593128 ||  || — || March 29, 2015 || Mount Lemmon || Mount Lemmon Survey ||  || align=right | 1.2 km || 
|-id=129 bgcolor=#C2FFFF
| 593129 ||  || — || September 29, 2009 || Kitt Peak || Spacewatch || L4 || align=right | 6.9 km || 
|-id=130 bgcolor=#E9E9E9
| 593130 ||  || — || August 26, 2000 || Cerro Tololo || R. Millis, L. H. Wasserman ||  || align=right data-sort-value="0.85" | 850 m || 
|-id=131 bgcolor=#E9E9E9
| 593131 ||  || — || March 21, 2015 || Haleakala || Pan-STARRS ||  || align=right data-sort-value="0.85" | 850 m || 
|-id=132 bgcolor=#C2FFFF
| 593132 ||  || — || March 31, 2003 || Apache Point || SDSS Collaboration || L4 || align=right | 8.4 km || 
|-id=133 bgcolor=#E9E9E9
| 593133 ||  || — || September 19, 2003 || Anderson Mesa || LONEOS ||  || align=right | 2.9 km || 
|-id=134 bgcolor=#fefefe
| 593134 ||  || — || September 3, 2013 || Haleakala || Pan-STARRS || H || align=right data-sort-value="0.49" | 490 m || 
|-id=135 bgcolor=#E9E9E9
| 593135 ||  || — || November 27, 2009 || Mount Lemmon || Mount Lemmon Survey ||  || align=right | 1.5 km || 
|-id=136 bgcolor=#E9E9E9
| 593136 ||  || — || October 17, 2012 || Haleakala || Pan-STARRS ||  || align=right | 1.8 km || 
|-id=137 bgcolor=#E9E9E9
| 593137 ||  || — || December 3, 2005 || Mauna Kea || Mauna Kea Obs. ||  || align=right | 1.2 km || 
|-id=138 bgcolor=#E9E9E9
| 593138 ||  || — || January 14, 2002 || Kitt Peak || Spacewatch ||  || align=right | 1.2 km || 
|-id=139 bgcolor=#E9E9E9
| 593139 ||  || — || March 27, 2015 || Haleakala || Pan-STARRS ||  || align=right | 1.7 km || 
|-id=140 bgcolor=#C2FFFF
| 593140 ||  || — || February 10, 2014 || Haleakala || Pan-STARRS || L4 || align=right | 6.8 km || 
|-id=141 bgcolor=#E9E9E9
| 593141 ||  || — || November 9, 2013 || Kitt Peak || Spacewatch ||  || align=right | 1.5 km || 
|-id=142 bgcolor=#E9E9E9
| 593142 ||  || — || November 24, 2013 || Haleakala || Pan-STARRS ||  || align=right | 1.2 km || 
|-id=143 bgcolor=#E9E9E9
| 593143 ||  || — || October 25, 2008 || Catalina || CSS ||  || align=right | 1.6 km || 
|-id=144 bgcolor=#E9E9E9
| 593144 ||  || — || March 21, 2015 || Haleakala || Pan-STARRS ||  || align=right | 1.5 km || 
|-id=145 bgcolor=#E9E9E9
| 593145 ||  || — || September 19, 2003 || Kitt Peak || Spacewatch ||  || align=right | 2.0 km || 
|-id=146 bgcolor=#E9E9E9
| 593146 ||  || — || February 23, 2015 || Haleakala || Pan-STARRS ||  || align=right | 1.8 km || 
|-id=147 bgcolor=#E9E9E9
| 593147 ||  || — || March 25, 2015 || Haleakala || Pan-STARRS ||  || align=right | 1.6 km || 
|-id=148 bgcolor=#E9E9E9
| 593148 ||  || — || May 9, 2007 || Catalina || CSS ||  || align=right | 1.0 km || 
|-id=149 bgcolor=#d6d6d6
| 593149 ||  || — || April 13, 2015 || Haleakala || Pan-STARRS ||  || align=right | 1.6 km || 
|-id=150 bgcolor=#fefefe
| 593150 ||  || — || September 27, 2003 || Kitt Peak || Spacewatch || H || align=right data-sort-value="0.53" | 530 m || 
|-id=151 bgcolor=#E9E9E9
| 593151 ||  || — || December 1, 2005 || Kitt Peak || L. H. Wasserman, R. Millis ||  || align=right | 1.6 km || 
|-id=152 bgcolor=#E9E9E9
| 593152 ||  || — || April 26, 2011 || Kitt Peak || Spacewatch ||  || align=right | 1.7 km || 
|-id=153 bgcolor=#E9E9E9
| 593153 ||  || — || September 4, 2008 || Kitt Peak || Spacewatch ||  || align=right | 1.4 km || 
|-id=154 bgcolor=#E9E9E9
| 593154 ||  || — || December 29, 2014 || Haleakala || Pan-STARRS ||  || align=right | 1.1 km || 
|-id=155 bgcolor=#E9E9E9
| 593155 ||  || — || May 26, 1998 || Kitt Peak || Spacewatch ||  || align=right | 1.8 km || 
|-id=156 bgcolor=#E9E9E9
| 593156 ||  || — || September 15, 1991 || Kitt Peak || Spacewatch ||  || align=right | 1.6 km || 
|-id=157 bgcolor=#E9E9E9
| 593157 ||  || — || January 21, 2015 || Haleakala || Pan-STARRS ||  || align=right | 2.0 km || 
|-id=158 bgcolor=#fefefe
| 593158 ||  || — || December 23, 2011 || Ka-Dar || V. Gerke || H || align=right data-sort-value="0.83" | 830 m || 
|-id=159 bgcolor=#E9E9E9
| 593159 ||  || — || October 7, 2004 || Kitt Peak || Spacewatch ||  || align=right | 1.2 km || 
|-id=160 bgcolor=#E9E9E9
| 593160 ||  || — || April 9, 2015 || Mount Lemmon || Mount Lemmon Survey ||  || align=right | 1.7 km || 
|-id=161 bgcolor=#E9E9E9
| 593161 ||  || — || January 10, 2006 || Mount Lemmon || Mount Lemmon Survey ||  || align=right | 1.2 km || 
|-id=162 bgcolor=#E9E9E9
| 593162 ||  || — || October 8, 2012 || Mount Lemmon || Mount Lemmon Survey ||  || align=right | 1.7 km || 
|-id=163 bgcolor=#d6d6d6
| 593163 ||  || — || December 31, 2013 || Mount Lemmon || Mount Lemmon Survey ||  || align=right | 1.9 km || 
|-id=164 bgcolor=#E9E9E9
| 593164 ||  || — || December 15, 2009 || Catalina || CSS ||  || align=right | 1.1 km || 
|-id=165 bgcolor=#E9E9E9
| 593165 ||  || — || January 26, 2006 || Kitt Peak || Spacewatch ||  || align=right | 1.6 km || 
|-id=166 bgcolor=#E9E9E9
| 593166 ||  || — || April 17, 2015 || Mount Lemmon || Mount Lemmon Survey ||  || align=right | 1.5 km || 
|-id=167 bgcolor=#E9E9E9
| 593167 ||  || — || September 26, 2003 || Apache Point || SDSS Collaboration ||  || align=right | 1.7 km || 
|-id=168 bgcolor=#E9E9E9
| 593168 ||  || — || March 1, 2011 || Kitt Peak || Spacewatch ||  || align=right data-sort-value="0.76" | 760 m || 
|-id=169 bgcolor=#E9E9E9
| 593169 ||  || — || April 20, 2015 || Haleakala || Pan-STARRS ||  || align=right | 1.6 km || 
|-id=170 bgcolor=#E9E9E9
| 593170 ||  || — || October 26, 2013 || Kitt Peak || Spacewatch ||  || align=right data-sort-value="0.84" | 840 m || 
|-id=171 bgcolor=#E9E9E9
| 593171 ||  || — || February 9, 2005 || Mount Lemmon || Mount Lemmon Survey ||  || align=right | 1.9 km || 
|-id=172 bgcolor=#d6d6d6
| 593172 ||  || — || December 22, 2008 || Kitt Peak || Spacewatch ||  || align=right | 2.0 km || 
|-id=173 bgcolor=#E9E9E9
| 593173 ||  || — || February 14, 2010 || Mount Lemmon || Mount Lemmon Survey ||  || align=right | 1.7 km || 
|-id=174 bgcolor=#E9E9E9
| 593174 ||  || — || March 18, 2015 || Haleakala || Pan-STARRS ||  || align=right | 1.5 km || 
|-id=175 bgcolor=#E9E9E9
| 593175 ||  || — || April 25, 2007 || Mount Lemmon || Mount Lemmon Survey ||  || align=right | 1.4 km || 
|-id=176 bgcolor=#C2FFFF
| 593176 ||  || — || January 28, 2012 || Haleakala || Pan-STARRS || L4 || align=right | 10 km || 
|-id=177 bgcolor=#E9E9E9
| 593177 ||  || — || March 27, 2015 || Haleakala || Pan-STARRS ||  || align=right | 1.7 km || 
|-id=178 bgcolor=#E9E9E9
| 593178 ||  || — || March 25, 2015 || Haleakala || Pan-STARRS ||  || align=right data-sort-value="0.94" | 940 m || 
|-id=179 bgcolor=#E9E9E9
| 593179 ||  || — || March 25, 2015 || Haleakala || Pan-STARRS ||  || align=right | 1.8 km || 
|-id=180 bgcolor=#E9E9E9
| 593180 ||  || — || March 21, 2015 || Haleakala || Pan-STARRS ||  || align=right | 1.8 km || 
|-id=181 bgcolor=#E9E9E9
| 593181 ||  || — || August 13, 2012 || Haleakala || Pan-STARRS ||  || align=right | 1.1 km || 
|-id=182 bgcolor=#E9E9E9
| 593182 ||  || — || November 3, 2008 || Mount Lemmon || Mount Lemmon Survey ||  || align=right | 2.2 km || 
|-id=183 bgcolor=#E9E9E9
| 593183 ||  || — || March 4, 2006 || Kitt Peak || Spacewatch ||  || align=right | 1.4 km || 
|-id=184 bgcolor=#E9E9E9
| 593184 ||  || — || April 12, 2011 || Catalina || CSS ||  || align=right | 1.7 km || 
|-id=185 bgcolor=#fefefe
| 593185 ||  || — || October 22, 2008 || Mount Lemmon || Mount Lemmon Survey || H || align=right data-sort-value="0.54" | 540 m || 
|-id=186 bgcolor=#E9E9E9
| 593186 ||  || — || March 22, 2015 || Haleakala || Pan-STARRS ||  || align=right | 2.2 km || 
|-id=187 bgcolor=#E9E9E9
| 593187 ||  || — || December 4, 2013 || Haleakala || Pan-STARRS ||  || align=right | 2.0 km || 
|-id=188 bgcolor=#E9E9E9
| 593188 ||  || — || November 21, 2001 || Apache Point || SDSS Collaboration ||  || align=right data-sort-value="0.87" | 870 m || 
|-id=189 bgcolor=#E9E9E9
| 593189 ||  || — || April 23, 2015 || Haleakala || Pan-STARRS ||  || align=right | 1.5 km || 
|-id=190 bgcolor=#d6d6d6
| 593190 ||  || — || September 21, 2012 || Kitt Peak || Spacewatch ||  || align=right | 1.7 km || 
|-id=191 bgcolor=#d6d6d6
| 593191 ||  || — || April 23, 2015 || Haleakala || Pan-STARRS ||  || align=right | 1.5 km || 
|-id=192 bgcolor=#E9E9E9
| 593192 ||  || — || September 21, 2003 || Kitt Peak || Spacewatch ||  || align=right | 1.8 km || 
|-id=193 bgcolor=#d6d6d6
| 593193 ||  || — || January 21, 2014 || Mount Lemmon || Mount Lemmon Survey ||  || align=right | 1.8 km || 
|-id=194 bgcolor=#E9E9E9
| 593194 ||  || — || October 6, 2012 || Mount Lemmon || Mount Lemmon Survey ||  || align=right | 2.1 km || 
|-id=195 bgcolor=#E9E9E9
| 593195 Lavinaahmed ||  ||  || December 6, 2012 || Tincana || M. Żołnowski, M. Kusiak ||  || align=right data-sort-value="0.88" | 880 m || 
|-id=196 bgcolor=#E9E9E9
| 593196 ||  || — || February 14, 2010 || Mount Lemmon || Mount Lemmon Survey ||  || align=right | 1.7 km || 
|-id=197 bgcolor=#E9E9E9
| 593197 ||  || — || October 15, 2009 || Mount Lemmon || Mount Lemmon Survey ||  || align=right data-sort-value="0.96" | 960 m || 
|-id=198 bgcolor=#d6d6d6
| 593198 ||  || — || April 23, 2015 || Haleakala || Pan-STARRS ||  || align=right | 1.9 km || 
|-id=199 bgcolor=#E9E9E9
| 593199 ||  || — || April 26, 2011 || Bergisch Gladbach || W. Bickel ||  || align=right | 2.1 km || 
|-id=200 bgcolor=#E9E9E9
| 593200 ||  || — || November 20, 2003 || Kitt Peak || Spacewatch ||  || align=right | 1.8 km || 
|}

593201–593300 

|-bgcolor=#E9E9E9
| 593201 ||  || — || October 14, 2012 || Kitt Peak || Spacewatch ||  || align=right | 1.9 km || 
|-id=202 bgcolor=#d6d6d6
| 593202 ||  || — || April 23, 2015 || Haleakala || Pan-STARRS ||  || align=right | 1.8 km || 
|-id=203 bgcolor=#E9E9E9
| 593203 ||  || — || September 9, 2007 || Kitt Peak || Spacewatch ||  || align=right | 1.7 km || 
|-id=204 bgcolor=#E9E9E9
| 593204 ||  || — || November 17, 2009 || Mount Lemmon || Mount Lemmon Survey ||  || align=right | 1.1 km || 
|-id=205 bgcolor=#d6d6d6
| 593205 ||  || — || February 1, 2005 || Kitt Peak || Spacewatch ||  || align=right | 1.9 km || 
|-id=206 bgcolor=#E9E9E9
| 593206 ||  || — || February 23, 2015 || Haleakala || Pan-STARRS ||  || align=right | 1.4 km || 
|-id=207 bgcolor=#E9E9E9
| 593207 ||  || — || January 5, 2006 || Mount Lemmon || Mount Lemmon Survey ||  || align=right | 1.5 km || 
|-id=208 bgcolor=#E9E9E9
| 593208 ||  || — || March 25, 2015 || Haleakala || Pan-STARRS ||  || align=right | 1.5 km || 
|-id=209 bgcolor=#E9E9E9
| 593209 ||  || — || January 8, 2010 || Mount Lemmon || Mount Lemmon Survey ||  || align=right | 2.1 km || 
|-id=210 bgcolor=#fefefe
| 593210 ||  || — || March 22, 2015 || Haleakala || Pan-STARRS || H || align=right data-sort-value="0.58" | 580 m || 
|-id=211 bgcolor=#E9E9E9
| 593211 ||  || — || October 2, 2003 || Kitt Peak || Spacewatch ||  || align=right | 1.7 km || 
|-id=212 bgcolor=#E9E9E9
| 593212 ||  || — || January 5, 2006 || Catalina || CSS ||  || align=right data-sort-value="0.80" | 800 m || 
|-id=213 bgcolor=#E9E9E9
| 593213 ||  || — || October 23, 2012 || Mount Lemmon || Mount Lemmon Survey ||  || align=right | 1.7 km || 
|-id=214 bgcolor=#d6d6d6
| 593214 ||  || — || October 17, 2012 || Haleakala || Pan-STARRS ||  || align=right | 1.6 km || 
|-id=215 bgcolor=#E9E9E9
| 593215 ||  || — || February 9, 2005 || Mount Lemmon || Mount Lemmon Survey ||  || align=right | 1.7 km || 
|-id=216 bgcolor=#E9E9E9
| 593216 ||  || — || April 23, 2015 || Haleakala || Pan-STARRS ||  || align=right | 1.7 km || 
|-id=217 bgcolor=#E9E9E9
| 593217 ||  || — || December 1, 2008 || Kitt Peak || Spacewatch ||  || align=right | 1.7 km || 
|-id=218 bgcolor=#E9E9E9
| 593218 ||  || — || October 13, 2004 || Kitt Peak || Spacewatch ||  || align=right | 1.2 km || 
|-id=219 bgcolor=#E9E9E9
| 593219 ||  || — || October 18, 2012 || Haleakala || Pan-STARRS ||  || align=right | 1.7 km || 
|-id=220 bgcolor=#E9E9E9
| 593220 ||  || — || September 14, 2007 || Mount Lemmon || Mount Lemmon Survey ||  || align=right | 1.9 km || 
|-id=221 bgcolor=#d6d6d6
| 593221 ||  || — || August 25, 2001 || Palomar || NEAT ||  || align=right | 2.0 km || 
|-id=222 bgcolor=#E9E9E9
| 593222 ||  || — || April 15, 2007 || Kitt Peak || Spacewatch ||  || align=right | 1.1 km || 
|-id=223 bgcolor=#E9E9E9
| 593223 ||  || — || April 17, 2015 || Mount Lemmon || Mount Lemmon Survey ||  || align=right | 1.5 km || 
|-id=224 bgcolor=#d6d6d6
| 593224 ||  || — || September 4, 2011 || Haleakala || Pan-STARRS ||  || align=right | 1.8 km || 
|-id=225 bgcolor=#E9E9E9
| 593225 ||  || — || September 29, 2003 || Kitt Peak || Spacewatch ||  || align=right | 2.0 km || 
|-id=226 bgcolor=#E9E9E9
| 593226 ||  || — || February 9, 2005 || Mount Lemmon || Mount Lemmon Survey ||  || align=right | 1.9 km || 
|-id=227 bgcolor=#E9E9E9
| 593227 ||  || — || January 22, 2006 || Mount Lemmon || Mount Lemmon Survey ||  || align=right data-sort-value="0.81" | 810 m || 
|-id=228 bgcolor=#E9E9E9
| 593228 ||  || — || September 11, 2007 || Mount Lemmon || Mount Lemmon Survey ||  || align=right | 1.7 km || 
|-id=229 bgcolor=#C2FFFF
| 593229 ||  || — || April 28, 2015 || Mount Lemmon || Mount Lemmon Survey || L4 || align=right | 9.8 km || 
|-id=230 bgcolor=#E9E9E9
| 593230 ||  || — || September 5, 2000 || Apache Point || SDSS Collaboration ||  || align=right | 1.5 km || 
|-id=231 bgcolor=#E9E9E9
| 593231 ||  || — || March 29, 2015 || Haleakala || Pan-STARRS ||  || align=right | 2.2 km || 
|-id=232 bgcolor=#fefefe
| 593232 ||  || — || October 30, 2008 || Kitt Peak || Spacewatch || H || align=right data-sort-value="0.43" | 430 m || 
|-id=233 bgcolor=#fefefe
| 593233 ||  || — || December 22, 2008 || Mount Lemmon || Mount Lemmon Survey || H || align=right data-sort-value="0.46" | 460 m || 
|-id=234 bgcolor=#d6d6d6
| 593234 ||  || — || April 23, 2015 || Haleakala || Pan-STARRS ||  || align=right | 1.7 km || 
|-id=235 bgcolor=#E9E9E9
| 593235 ||  || — || January 5, 2014 || Kitt Peak || Spacewatch ||  || align=right | 1.3 km || 
|-id=236 bgcolor=#E9E9E9
| 593236 ||  || — || December 7, 2013 || Nogales || M. Schwartz, P. R. Holvorcem ||  || align=right | 1.5 km || 
|-id=237 bgcolor=#E9E9E9
| 593237 ||  || — || November 9, 2013 || Mount Lemmon || Mount Lemmon Survey ||  || align=right | 1.3 km || 
|-id=238 bgcolor=#E9E9E9
| 593238 ||  || — || April 20, 2015 || Haleakala || Pan-STARRS ||  || align=right | 1.3 km || 
|-id=239 bgcolor=#E9E9E9
| 593239 ||  || — || October 24, 2003 || Apache Point || SDSS Collaboration ||  || align=right | 2.3 km || 
|-id=240 bgcolor=#d6d6d6
| 593240 ||  || — || April 25, 2015 || Haleakala || Pan-STARRS ||  || align=right | 1.6 km || 
|-id=241 bgcolor=#d6d6d6
| 593241 ||  || — || April 25, 2015 || Haleakala || Pan-STARRS ||  || align=right | 1.7 km || 
|-id=242 bgcolor=#d6d6d6
| 593242 ||  || — || April 24, 2015 || Haleakala || Pan-STARRS ||  || align=right | 1.6 km || 
|-id=243 bgcolor=#C2FFFF
| 593243 ||  || — || April 23, 2015 || Haleakala || Pan-STARRS || L4 || align=right | 7.2 km || 
|-id=244 bgcolor=#E9E9E9
| 593244 ||  || — || September 26, 2017 || Haleakala || Pan-STARRS ||  || align=right | 1.5 km || 
|-id=245 bgcolor=#C2FFFF
| 593245 ||  || — || April 25, 2015 || Haleakala || Pan-STARRS || L4 || align=right | 5.7 km || 
|-id=246 bgcolor=#E9E9E9
| 593246 ||  || — || April 25, 2015 || Haleakala || Pan-STARRS ||  || align=right | 1.6 km || 
|-id=247 bgcolor=#d6d6d6
| 593247 ||  || — || April 20, 2015 || Haleakala || Pan-STARRS ||  || align=right | 1.6 km || 
|-id=248 bgcolor=#d6d6d6
| 593248 ||  || — || May 14, 2015 || Haleakala || Pan-STARRS ||  || align=right | 2.0 km || 
|-id=249 bgcolor=#FA8072
| 593249 ||  || — || November 19, 2003 || Palomar || NEAT || H || align=right data-sort-value="0.61" | 610 m || 
|-id=250 bgcolor=#E9E9E9
| 593250 ||  || — || March 11, 2011 || Mount Lemmon || Mount Lemmon Survey ||  || align=right | 1.00 km || 
|-id=251 bgcolor=#E9E9E9
| 593251 ||  || — || January 31, 2015 || Haleakala || Pan-STARRS ||  || align=right | 1.8 km || 
|-id=252 bgcolor=#E9E9E9
| 593252 ||  || — || September 9, 2007 || Kitt Peak || Spacewatch ||  || align=right | 2.3 km || 
|-id=253 bgcolor=#E9E9E9
| 593253 ||  || — || January 1, 2014 || Mount Lemmon || Mount Lemmon Survey ||  || align=right | 2.0 km || 
|-id=254 bgcolor=#d6d6d6
| 593254 ||  || — || March 31, 2015 || Haleakala || Pan-STARRS ||  || align=right | 2.1 km || 
|-id=255 bgcolor=#E9E9E9
| 593255 ||  || — || January 17, 2000 || Mauna Kea || C. Veillet ||  || align=right | 2.1 km || 
|-id=256 bgcolor=#E9E9E9
| 593256 ||  || — || March 23, 2006 || Catalina || CSS ||  || align=right | 1.4 km || 
|-id=257 bgcolor=#E9E9E9
| 593257 ||  || — || May 20, 2015 || Mount Lemmon || Mount Lemmon Survey ||  || align=right | 1.4 km || 
|-id=258 bgcolor=#d6d6d6
| 593258 ||  || — || May 13, 2015 || Cerro Paranal || M. Altmann, T. Prusti ||  || align=right | 2.1 km || 
|-id=259 bgcolor=#d6d6d6
| 593259 ||  || — || October 19, 2012 || Mount Lemmon || Mount Lemmon Survey ||  || align=right | 2.3 km || 
|-id=260 bgcolor=#E9E9E9
| 593260 ||  || — || March 4, 2005 || Mount Lemmon || Mount Lemmon Survey ||  || align=right | 1.7 km || 
|-id=261 bgcolor=#E9E9E9
| 593261 ||  || — || November 19, 2003 || Kitt Peak || Spacewatch ||  || align=right | 1.8 km || 
|-id=262 bgcolor=#d6d6d6
| 593262 ||  || — || November 5, 2007 || Mount Lemmon || Mount Lemmon Survey ||  || align=right | 2.1 km || 
|-id=263 bgcolor=#E9E9E9
| 593263 ||  || — || October 29, 2003 || Kitt Peak || Spacewatch ||  || align=right | 2.2 km || 
|-id=264 bgcolor=#d6d6d6
| 593264 ||  || — || May 20, 2015 || Haleakala || Pan-STARRS ||  || align=right | 1.9 km || 
|-id=265 bgcolor=#E9E9E9
| 593265 ||  || — || May 20, 2015 || Haleakala || Pan-STARRS ||  || align=right | 1.4 km || 
|-id=266 bgcolor=#d6d6d6
| 593266 ||  || — || December 7, 2012 || Haleakala || Pan-STARRS ||  || align=right | 2.2 km || 
|-id=267 bgcolor=#d6d6d6
| 593267 ||  || — || May 21, 2015 || Haleakala || Pan-STARRS ||  || align=right | 2.1 km || 
|-id=268 bgcolor=#E9E9E9
| 593268 ||  || — || May 18, 2015 || Wildberg || R. Apitzsch ||  || align=right | 2.2 km || 
|-id=269 bgcolor=#d6d6d6
| 593269 ||  || — || May 31, 2011 || Mount Lemmon || Mount Lemmon Survey ||  || align=right | 2.3 km || 
|-id=270 bgcolor=#d6d6d6
| 593270 ||  || — || February 28, 2014 || Haleakala || Pan-STARRS ||  || align=right | 1.7 km || 
|-id=271 bgcolor=#d6d6d6
| 593271 ||  || — || May 21, 2015 || Haleakala || Pan-STARRS ||  || align=right | 1.6 km || 
|-id=272 bgcolor=#E9E9E9
| 593272 ||  || — || September 29, 2003 || Kitt Peak || Spacewatch ||  || align=right | 2.0 km || 
|-id=273 bgcolor=#E9E9E9
| 593273 ||  || — || October 15, 2012 || Mount Lemmon || Mount Lemmon Survey ||  || align=right | 1.8 km || 
|-id=274 bgcolor=#E9E9E9
| 593274 ||  || — || February 24, 2014 || Haleakala || Pan-STARRS ||  || align=right | 2.1 km || 
|-id=275 bgcolor=#E9E9E9
| 593275 ||  || — || September 3, 2008 || Kitt Peak || Spacewatch ||  || align=right | 1.2 km || 
|-id=276 bgcolor=#E9E9E9
| 593276 ||  || — || October 20, 2012 || Mount Lemmon || Mount Lemmon Survey ||  || align=right | 1.8 km || 
|-id=277 bgcolor=#d6d6d6
| 593277 ||  || — || February 21, 2014 || Mount Lemmon || Mount Lemmon Survey ||  || align=right | 2.2 km || 
|-id=278 bgcolor=#E9E9E9
| 593278 ||  || — || February 20, 2014 || Mount Lemmon || Mount Lemmon Survey ||  || align=right | 1.8 km || 
|-id=279 bgcolor=#E9E9E9
| 593279 ||  || — || September 27, 2008 || Mount Lemmon || Mount Lemmon Survey ||  || align=right | 1.3 km || 
|-id=280 bgcolor=#E9E9E9
| 593280 ||  || — || December 6, 2012 || Mount Lemmon || Mount Lemmon Survey ||  || align=right | 1.0 km || 
|-id=281 bgcolor=#E9E9E9
| 593281 ||  || — || December 11, 2012 || Mount Lemmon || Mount Lemmon Survey ||  || align=right | 2.5 km || 
|-id=282 bgcolor=#E9E9E9
| 593282 ||  || — || April 18, 2015 || Haleakala || Pan-STARRS ||  || align=right | 1.7 km || 
|-id=283 bgcolor=#E9E9E9
| 593283 ||  || — || November 21, 2008 || Mount Lemmon || Mount Lemmon Survey ||  || align=right | 1.5 km || 
|-id=284 bgcolor=#E9E9E9
| 593284 ||  || — || April 20, 2015 || Haleakala || Pan-STARRS ||  || align=right | 1.5 km || 
|-id=285 bgcolor=#E9E9E9
| 593285 ||  || — || May 18, 2015 || Haleakala || Pan-STARRS 2 ||  || align=right data-sort-value="0.90" | 900 m || 
|-id=286 bgcolor=#E9E9E9
| 593286 ||  || — || October 18, 2012 || Haleakala || Pan-STARRS ||  || align=right | 1.6 km || 
|-id=287 bgcolor=#E9E9E9
| 593287 ||  || — || October 20, 2003 || Kitt Peak || Spacewatch ||  || align=right | 2.2 km || 
|-id=288 bgcolor=#d6d6d6
| 593288 ||  || — || December 12, 2012 || Kitt Peak || Spacewatch ||  || align=right | 2.4 km || 
|-id=289 bgcolor=#E9E9E9
| 593289 ||  || — || March 10, 2005 || Kitt Peak || M. W. Buie, L. H. Wasserman ||  || align=right | 1.8 km || 
|-id=290 bgcolor=#d6d6d6
| 593290 ||  || — || May 25, 2015 || Haleakala || Pan-STARRS ||  || align=right | 2.0 km || 
|-id=291 bgcolor=#fefefe
| 593291 ||  || — || May 25, 2015 || Haleakala || Pan-STARRS || H || align=right data-sort-value="0.68" | 680 m || 
|-id=292 bgcolor=#d6d6d6
| 593292 ||  || — || August 24, 2005 || Palomar || NEAT ||  || align=right | 3.6 km || 
|-id=293 bgcolor=#C2FFFF
| 593293 ||  || — || September 25, 2009 || Kitt Peak || Spacewatch || L4 || align=right | 7.0 km || 
|-id=294 bgcolor=#E9E9E9
| 593294 ||  || — || November 4, 2012 || Mount Lemmon || Mount Lemmon Survey ||  || align=right | 1.9 km || 
|-id=295 bgcolor=#d6d6d6
| 593295 ||  || — || February 9, 2008 || Mount Lemmon || Mount Lemmon Survey ||  || align=right | 2.4 km || 
|-id=296 bgcolor=#E9E9E9
| 593296 ||  || — || May 29, 2015 || Haleakala || Pan-STARRS ||  || align=right | 1.5 km || 
|-id=297 bgcolor=#d6d6d6
| 593297 ||  || — || May 25, 2015 || Haleakala || Pan-STARRS ||  || align=right | 2.0 km || 
|-id=298 bgcolor=#d6d6d6
| 593298 ||  || — || May 21, 2015 || Haleakala || Pan-STARRS ||  || align=right | 1.9 km || 
|-id=299 bgcolor=#d6d6d6
| 593299 ||  || — || May 22, 2015 || Haleakala || Pan-STARRS ||  || align=right | 2.0 km || 
|-id=300 bgcolor=#E9E9E9
| 593300 ||  || — || March 25, 2015 || Haleakala || Pan-STARRS ||  || align=right | 2.1 km || 
|}

593301–593400 

|-bgcolor=#C2FFFF
| 593301 ||  || — || April 12, 2015 || Haleakala || Pan-STARRS || L4 || align=right | 9.2 km || 
|-id=302 bgcolor=#E9E9E9
| 593302 ||  || — || November 16, 2009 || Mount Lemmon || Mount Lemmon Survey ||  || align=right | 1.4 km || 
|-id=303 bgcolor=#E9E9E9
| 593303 ||  || — || July 2, 2011 || Kitt Peak || Spacewatch ||  || align=right | 2.8 km || 
|-id=304 bgcolor=#d6d6d6
| 593304 ||  || — || March 22, 2015 || Haleakala || Pan-STARRS ||  || align=right | 2.4 km || 
|-id=305 bgcolor=#d6d6d6
| 593305 ||  || — || January 4, 2003 || Kitt Peak || I. dell'Antonio, D. Loomba ||  || align=right | 2.8 km || 
|-id=306 bgcolor=#fefefe
| 593306 ||  || — || October 26, 2008 || Mount Lemmon || Mount Lemmon Survey || H || align=right data-sort-value="0.76" | 760 m || 
|-id=307 bgcolor=#fefefe
| 593307 ||  || — || June 7, 2015 || Haleakala || Pan-STARRS || H || align=right data-sort-value="0.57" | 570 m || 
|-id=308 bgcolor=#d6d6d6
| 593308 ||  || — || February 21, 2014 || Mayhill-ISON || L. Elenin ||  || align=right | 2.9 km || 
|-id=309 bgcolor=#E9E9E9
| 593309 ||  || — || December 4, 2012 || Mount Lemmon || Mount Lemmon Survey ||  || align=right | 3.2 km || 
|-id=310 bgcolor=#fefefe
| 593310 ||  || — || April 26, 2009 || Mount Lemmon || Mount Lemmon Survey || H || align=right data-sort-value="0.98" | 980 m || 
|-id=311 bgcolor=#fefefe
| 593311 ||  || — || March 15, 2012 || Mount Lemmon || Mount Lemmon Survey || H || align=right data-sort-value="0.59" | 590 m || 
|-id=312 bgcolor=#E9E9E9
| 593312 ||  || — || August 14, 2006 || Palomar || NEAT ||  || align=right | 2.9 km || 
|-id=313 bgcolor=#E9E9E9
| 593313 ||  || — || September 21, 2012 || Kitt Peak || Spacewatch ||  || align=right | 2.5 km || 
|-id=314 bgcolor=#E9E9E9
| 593314 ||  || — || October 10, 2008 || Mount Lemmon || Mount Lemmon Survey ||  || align=right | 1.6 km || 
|-id=315 bgcolor=#E9E9E9
| 593315 ||  || — || October 20, 1995 || Kitt Peak || Spacewatch ||  || align=right | 1.3 km || 
|-id=316 bgcolor=#d6d6d6
| 593316 ||  || — || June 10, 2015 || Haleakala || Pan-STARRS ||  || align=right | 1.9 km || 
|-id=317 bgcolor=#E9E9E9
| 593317 ||  || — || August 7, 2016 || Haleakala || Pan-STARRS ||  || align=right | 1.3 km || 
|-id=318 bgcolor=#d6d6d6
| 593318 ||  || — || November 17, 2011 || Kitt Peak || Spacewatch ||  || align=right | 3.2 km || 
|-id=319 bgcolor=#fefefe
| 593319 ||  || — || June 16, 2015 || Haleakala || Pan-STARRS || H || align=right data-sort-value="0.65" | 650 m || 
|-id=320 bgcolor=#d6d6d6
| 593320 ||  || — || March 8, 2014 || Mount Lemmon || Mount Lemmon Survey ||  || align=right | 2.3 km || 
|-id=321 bgcolor=#E9E9E9
| 593321 ||  || — || October 28, 2008 || Mount Lemmon || Mount Lemmon Survey ||  || align=right | 1.8 km || 
|-id=322 bgcolor=#E9E9E9
| 593322 ||  || — || September 20, 2007 || Kitt Peak || Spacewatch ||  || align=right | 1.8 km || 
|-id=323 bgcolor=#E9E9E9
| 593323 ||  || — || November 24, 2008 || Kitt Peak || Spacewatch ||  || align=right | 1.9 km || 
|-id=324 bgcolor=#d6d6d6
| 593324 ||  || — || November 18, 2006 || Mount Lemmon || Mount Lemmon Survey ||  || align=right | 3.8 km || 
|-id=325 bgcolor=#d6d6d6
| 593325 ||  || — || December 1, 2011 || Haleakala || Pan-STARRS ||  || align=right | 2.5 km || 
|-id=326 bgcolor=#d6d6d6
| 593326 ||  || — || January 17, 2007 || Mount Lemmon || Mount Lemmon Survey ||  || align=right | 2.4 km || 
|-id=327 bgcolor=#d6d6d6
| 593327 ||  || — || June 20, 2015 || Haleakala || Pan-STARRS ||  || align=right | 2.3 km || 
|-id=328 bgcolor=#d6d6d6
| 593328 ||  || — || June 22, 2015 || Haleakala || Pan-STARRS ||  || align=right | 1.9 km || 
|-id=329 bgcolor=#d6d6d6
| 593329 ||  || — || March 10, 2014 || Mount Lemmon || Mount Lemmon Survey ||  || align=right | 2.1 km || 
|-id=330 bgcolor=#d6d6d6
| 593330 ||  || — || February 2, 2008 || Kitt Peak || Spacewatch ||  || align=right | 2.3 km || 
|-id=331 bgcolor=#d6d6d6
| 593331 ||  || — || August 24, 2005 || Palomar || NEAT ||  || align=right | 2.1 km || 
|-id=332 bgcolor=#d6d6d6
| 593332 ||  || — || June 18, 2015 || Haleakala || Pan-STARRS ||  || align=right | 2.0 km || 
|-id=333 bgcolor=#d6d6d6
| 593333 ||  || — || June 22, 2015 || Haleakala || Pan-STARRS ||  || align=right | 1.8 km || 
|-id=334 bgcolor=#d6d6d6
| 593334 ||  || — || February 7, 2002 || Palomar || NEAT ||  || align=right | 3.1 km || 
|-id=335 bgcolor=#d6d6d6
| 593335 ||  || — || April 28, 2009 || Kitt Peak || Spacewatch ||  || align=right | 2.4 km || 
|-id=336 bgcolor=#d6d6d6
| 593336 ||  || — || June 18, 2015 || Haleakala || Pan-STARRS ||  || align=right | 2.1 km || 
|-id=337 bgcolor=#d6d6d6
| 593337 ||  || — || January 17, 2013 || Mount Lemmon || Mount Lemmon Survey ||  || align=right | 2.1 km || 
|-id=338 bgcolor=#d6d6d6
| 593338 ||  || — || February 9, 2013 || Haleakala || Pan-STARRS ||  || align=right | 2.3 km || 
|-id=339 bgcolor=#d6d6d6
| 593339 ||  || — || November 6, 2010 || Kitt Peak || Spacewatch ||  || align=right | 3.2 km || 
|-id=340 bgcolor=#d6d6d6
| 593340 ||  || — || December 31, 2011 || Mount Lemmon || Mount Lemmon Survey ||  || align=right | 2.9 km || 
|-id=341 bgcolor=#d6d6d6
| 593341 ||  || — || April 18, 2009 || Kitt Peak || Spacewatch ||  || align=right | 2.0 km || 
|-id=342 bgcolor=#d6d6d6
| 593342 ||  || — || August 30, 2005 || Kitt Peak || Spacewatch ||  || align=right | 2.8 km || 
|-id=343 bgcolor=#d6d6d6
| 593343 ||  || — || September 18, 2010 || Mount Lemmon || Mount Lemmon Survey ||  || align=right | 2.1 km || 
|-id=344 bgcolor=#d6d6d6
| 593344 ||  || — || June 15, 2015 || Haleakala || Pan-STARRS ||  || align=right | 2.1 km || 
|-id=345 bgcolor=#d6d6d6
| 593345 ||  || — || January 22, 2002 || Kitt Peak || Spacewatch ||  || align=right | 2.9 km || 
|-id=346 bgcolor=#d6d6d6
| 593346 ||  || — || May 5, 2003 || Kitt Peak || Spacewatch ||  || align=right | 2.4 km || 
|-id=347 bgcolor=#d6d6d6
| 593347 ||  || — || September 18, 2010 || Mount Lemmon || Mount Lemmon Survey ||  || align=right | 2.9 km || 
|-id=348 bgcolor=#d6d6d6
| 593348 ||  || — || July 11, 2004 || Anderson Mesa || LONEOS ||  || align=right | 3.3 km || 
|-id=349 bgcolor=#d6d6d6
| 593349 ||  || — || January 15, 2007 || Bergisch Gladbach || W. Bickel ||  || align=right | 3.6 km || 
|-id=350 bgcolor=#d6d6d6
| 593350 ||  || — || February 21, 2007 || Charleston || R. Holmes ||  || align=right | 2.8 km || 
|-id=351 bgcolor=#d6d6d6
| 593351 ||  || — || June 26, 2015 || Haleakala || Pan-STARRS ||  || align=right | 1.9 km || 
|-id=352 bgcolor=#d6d6d6
| 593352 ||  || — || April 20, 2014 || Mount Lemmon || Mount Lemmon Survey ||  || align=right | 2.0 km || 
|-id=353 bgcolor=#d6d6d6
| 593353 ||  || — || September 14, 2005 || Kitt Peak || Spacewatch ||  || align=right | 2.3 km || 
|-id=354 bgcolor=#d6d6d6
| 593354 ||  || — || April 29, 2014 || Haleakala || Pan-STARRS ||  || align=right | 2.3 km || 
|-id=355 bgcolor=#d6d6d6
| 593355 ||  || — || August 16, 2009 || Kitt Peak || Spacewatch ||  || align=right | 2.0 km || 
|-id=356 bgcolor=#d6d6d6
| 593356 ||  || — || June 26, 2015 || Haleakala || Pan-STARRS ||  || align=right | 2.7 km || 
|-id=357 bgcolor=#d6d6d6
| 593357 ||  || — || June 27, 2015 || Haleakala || Pan-STARRS ||  || align=right | 2.5 km || 
|-id=358 bgcolor=#d6d6d6
| 593358 ||  || — || June 24, 2015 || Haleakala || Pan-STARRS || 7:4 || align=right | 3.1 km || 
|-id=359 bgcolor=#d6d6d6
| 593359 ||  || — || June 17, 2015 || Haleakala || Pan-STARRS ||  || align=right | 1.9 km || 
|-id=360 bgcolor=#d6d6d6
| 593360 ||  || — || June 20, 2015 || Haleakala || Pan-STARRS ||  || align=right | 2.0 km || 
|-id=361 bgcolor=#E9E9E9
| 593361 ||  || — || June 23, 2015 || Haleakala || Pan-STARRS ||  || align=right | 1.7 km || 
|-id=362 bgcolor=#d6d6d6
| 593362 ||  || — || June 17, 2015 || Haleakala || Pan-STARRS ||  || align=right | 2.1 km || 
|-id=363 bgcolor=#d6d6d6
| 593363 ||  || — || June 18, 2015 || Haleakala || Pan-STARRS ||  || align=right | 3.3 km || 
|-id=364 bgcolor=#d6d6d6
| 593364 ||  || — || January 10, 2013 || Haleakala || Pan-STARRS ||  || align=right | 3.0 km || 
|-id=365 bgcolor=#d6d6d6
| 593365 ||  || — || February 15, 2013 || Haleakala || Pan-STARRS ||  || align=right | 2.8 km || 
|-id=366 bgcolor=#d6d6d6
| 593366 ||  || — || June 19, 2004 || Catalina || CSS ||  || align=right | 4.3 km || 
|-id=367 bgcolor=#d6d6d6
| 593367 ||  || — || August 1, 2016 || Haleakala || Pan-STARRS ||  || align=right | 2.1 km || 
|-id=368 bgcolor=#d6d6d6
| 593368 ||  || — || July 12, 2015 || Haleakala || Pan-STARRS ||  || align=right | 2.0 km || 
|-id=369 bgcolor=#d6d6d6
| 593369 ||  || — || March 2, 2008 || Kitt Peak || Spacewatch ||  || align=right | 3.3 km || 
|-id=370 bgcolor=#d6d6d6
| 593370 ||  || — || June 15, 2015 || Mount Lemmon || Mount Lemmon Survey ||  || align=right | 2.6 km || 
|-id=371 bgcolor=#d6d6d6
| 593371 ||  || — || September 29, 2005 || Mount Lemmon || Mount Lemmon Survey ||  || align=right | 2.8 km || 
|-id=372 bgcolor=#d6d6d6
| 593372 ||  || — || February 28, 2014 || Haleakala || Pan-STARRS ||  || align=right | 2.5 km || 
|-id=373 bgcolor=#d6d6d6
| 593373 ||  || — || March 8, 2008 || Mount Lemmon || Mount Lemmon Survey ||  || align=right | 2.4 km || 
|-id=374 bgcolor=#d6d6d6
| 593374 ||  || — || April 9, 2014 || Mount Lemmon || Mount Lemmon Survey ||  || align=right | 2.4 km || 
|-id=375 bgcolor=#d6d6d6
| 593375 ||  || — || October 24, 2011 || Mount Lemmon || Mount Lemmon Survey ||  || align=right | 2.2 km || 
|-id=376 bgcolor=#d6d6d6
| 593376 ||  || — || February 27, 2014 || Haleakala || Pan-STARRS ||  || align=right | 2.1 km || 
|-id=377 bgcolor=#d6d6d6
| 593377 ||  || — || April 24, 2014 || Haleakala || Pan-STARRS ||  || align=right | 2.8 km || 
|-id=378 bgcolor=#d6d6d6
| 593378 ||  || — || April 4, 2014 || Haleakala || Pan-STARRS ||  || align=right | 2.2 km || 
|-id=379 bgcolor=#d6d6d6
| 593379 ||  || — || June 20, 2015 || Haleakala || Pan-STARRS 2 ||  || align=right | 2.9 km || 
|-id=380 bgcolor=#d6d6d6
| 593380 ||  || — || January 25, 2007 || Kitt Peak || Spacewatch ||  || align=right | 3.0 km || 
|-id=381 bgcolor=#d6d6d6
| 593381 ||  || — || February 6, 2013 || Kitt Peak || Spacewatch ||  || align=right | 2.7 km || 
|-id=382 bgcolor=#d6d6d6
| 593382 ||  || — || December 13, 2006 || Mount Lemmon || Mount Lemmon Survey ||  || align=right | 3.0 km || 
|-id=383 bgcolor=#d6d6d6
| 593383 ||  || — || December 1, 2011 || Haleakala || Pan-STARRS ||  || align=right | 3.3 km || 
|-id=384 bgcolor=#d6d6d6
| 593384 ||  || — || October 2, 2010 || Kitt Peak || Spacewatch ||  || align=right | 2.0 km || 
|-id=385 bgcolor=#d6d6d6
| 593385 ||  || — || October 27, 2005 || Mount Lemmon || Mount Lemmon Survey ||  || align=right | 2.0 km || 
|-id=386 bgcolor=#d6d6d6
| 593386 ||  || — || February 15, 2013 || Haleakala || Pan-STARRS ||  || align=right | 2.9 km || 
|-id=387 bgcolor=#d6d6d6
| 593387 ||  || — || February 13, 2002 || Apache Point || SDSS Collaboration ||  || align=right | 3.2 km || 
|-id=388 bgcolor=#d6d6d6
| 593388 ||  || — || March 29, 2014 || Kitt Peak || Spacewatch ||  || align=right | 2.7 km || 
|-id=389 bgcolor=#d6d6d6
| 593389 ||  || — || October 24, 2011 || Haleakala || Pan-STARRS ||  || align=right | 2.4 km || 
|-id=390 bgcolor=#d6d6d6
| 593390 ||  || — || July 26, 2015 || Haleakala || Pan-STARRS ||  || align=right | 2.2 km || 
|-id=391 bgcolor=#d6d6d6
| 593391 ||  || — || December 7, 2005 || Kitt Peak || Spacewatch ||  || align=right | 3.1 km || 
|-id=392 bgcolor=#d6d6d6
| 593392 ||  || — || September 11, 2004 || Kitt Peak || Spacewatch ||  || align=right | 2.5 km || 
|-id=393 bgcolor=#fefefe
| 593393 ||  || — || July 18, 2015 || Haleakala || Pan-STARRS || H || align=right data-sort-value="0.55" | 550 m || 
|-id=394 bgcolor=#d6d6d6
| 593394 ||  || — || November 20, 2006 || Mount Lemmon || Mount Lemmon Survey ||  || align=right | 2.9 km || 
|-id=395 bgcolor=#d6d6d6
| 593395 ||  || — || July 23, 2015 || Haleakala || Pan-STARRS ||  || align=right | 3.1 km || 
|-id=396 bgcolor=#d6d6d6
| 593396 ||  || — || July 28, 2015 || Haleakala || Pan-STARRS ||  || align=right | 2.0 km || 
|-id=397 bgcolor=#d6d6d6
| 593397 ||  || — || July 19, 2015 || Haleakala || Pan-STARRS 2 ||  || align=right | 2.3 km || 
|-id=398 bgcolor=#d6d6d6
| 593398 ||  || — || July 19, 2015 || Haleakala || Pan-STARRS ||  || align=right | 2.2 km || 
|-id=399 bgcolor=#d6d6d6
| 593399 ||  || — || November 6, 2010 || Mount Lemmon || Mount Lemmon Survey ||  || align=right | 2.5 km || 
|-id=400 bgcolor=#d6d6d6
| 593400 ||  || — || November 2, 2010 || Mount Lemmon || Mount Lemmon Survey ||  || align=right | 2.6 km || 
|}

593401–593500 

|-bgcolor=#d6d6d6
| 593401 ||  || — || July 23, 2015 || Haleakala || Pan-STARRS ||  || align=right | 1.8 km || 
|-id=402 bgcolor=#d6d6d6
| 593402 ||  || — || December 31, 2011 || Kitt Peak || Spacewatch ||  || align=right | 2.7 km || 
|-id=403 bgcolor=#d6d6d6
| 593403 ||  || — || November 16, 2010 || Mount Lemmon || Mount Lemmon Survey ||  || align=right | 2.4 km || 
|-id=404 bgcolor=#d6d6d6
| 593404 ||  || — || July 24, 2015 || Haleakala || Pan-STARRS ||  || align=right | 2.4 km || 
|-id=405 bgcolor=#d6d6d6
| 593405 ||  || — || September 6, 2004 || Altschwendt || W. Ries ||  || align=right | 3.4 km || 
|-id=406 bgcolor=#d6d6d6
| 593406 ||  || — || October 30, 2010 || Piszkesteto || Z. Kuli, K. Sárneczky ||  || align=right | 2.5 km || 
|-id=407 bgcolor=#d6d6d6
| 593407 ||  || — || July 25, 2015 || Haleakala || Pan-STARRS ||  || align=right | 2.7 km || 
|-id=408 bgcolor=#d6d6d6
| 593408 ||  || — || July 25, 2015 || Haleakala || Pan-STARRS ||  || align=right | 3.1 km || 
|-id=409 bgcolor=#d6d6d6
| 593409 ||  || — || July 19, 2015 || Haleakala || Pan-STARRS ||  || align=right | 2.1 km || 
|-id=410 bgcolor=#d6d6d6
| 593410 ||  || — || July 25, 2015 || Haleakala || Pan-STARRS ||  || align=right | 2.8 km || 
|-id=411 bgcolor=#d6d6d6
| 593411 ||  || — || July 19, 2015 || Haleakala || Pan-STARRS ||  || align=right | 2.6 km || 
|-id=412 bgcolor=#d6d6d6
| 593412 ||  || — || July 28, 2015 || Haleakala || Pan-STARRS 2 ||  || align=right | 3.0 km || 
|-id=413 bgcolor=#d6d6d6
| 593413 ||  || — || July 23, 2015 || Haleakala || Pan-STARRS ||  || align=right | 2.4 km || 
|-id=414 bgcolor=#d6d6d6
| 593414 ||  || — || July 25, 2015 || Haleakala || Pan-STARRS ||  || align=right | 2.0 km || 
|-id=415 bgcolor=#d6d6d6
| 593415 ||  || — || July 23, 2015 || Haleakala || Pan-STARRS ||  || align=right | 2.2 km || 
|-id=416 bgcolor=#d6d6d6
| 593416 ||  || — || July 19, 2015 || Haleakala || Pan-STARRS ||  || align=right | 2.4 km || 
|-id=417 bgcolor=#d6d6d6
| 593417 ||  || — || July 23, 2015 || Haleakala || Pan-STARRS ||  || align=right | 2.3 km || 
|-id=418 bgcolor=#d6d6d6
| 593418 ||  || — || June 2, 2014 || Haleakala || Pan-STARRS ||  || align=right | 3.5 km || 
|-id=419 bgcolor=#d6d6d6
| 593419 ||  || — || July 23, 2015 || Haleakala || Pan-STARRS ||  || align=right | 2.5 km || 
|-id=420 bgcolor=#d6d6d6
| 593420 ||  || — || January 14, 2008 || Kitt Peak || Spacewatch ||  || align=right | 2.6 km || 
|-id=421 bgcolor=#d6d6d6
| 593421 ||  || — || February 16, 2013 || Kitt Peak || Spacewatch ||  || align=right | 2.3 km || 
|-id=422 bgcolor=#fefefe
| 593422 ||  || — || January 4, 2014 || Haleakala || Pan-STARRS || H || align=right data-sort-value="0.51" | 510 m || 
|-id=423 bgcolor=#d6d6d6
| 593423 ||  || — || April 30, 2014 || Haleakala || Pan-STARRS ||  || align=right | 2.2 km || 
|-id=424 bgcolor=#d6d6d6
| 593424 ||  || — || May 1, 2009 || Kitt Peak || Spacewatch ||  || align=right | 2.7 km || 
|-id=425 bgcolor=#d6d6d6
| 593425 ||  || — || September 14, 2005 || Kitt Peak || Spacewatch ||  || align=right | 2.9 km || 
|-id=426 bgcolor=#d6d6d6
| 593426 ||  || — || August 8, 2015 || Haleakala || Pan-STARRS ||  || align=right | 2.2 km || 
|-id=427 bgcolor=#d6d6d6
| 593427 ||  || — || May 25, 2014 || Haleakala || Pan-STARRS ||  || align=right | 2.5 km || 
|-id=428 bgcolor=#d6d6d6
| 593428 ||  || — || February 14, 2012 || Haleakala || Pan-STARRS ||  || align=right | 2.5 km || 
|-id=429 bgcolor=#d6d6d6
| 593429 ||  || — || August 8, 2015 || Haleakala || Pan-STARRS ||  || align=right | 2.3 km || 
|-id=430 bgcolor=#d6d6d6
| 593430 ||  || — || July 24, 2015 || Haleakala || Pan-STARRS ||  || align=right | 2.1 km || 
|-id=431 bgcolor=#d6d6d6
| 593431 ||  || — || September 4, 2010 || Mount Lemmon || Mount Lemmon Survey ||  || align=right | 2.2 km || 
|-id=432 bgcolor=#d6d6d6
| 593432 ||  || — || December 31, 2011 || Kitt Peak || Spacewatch ||  || align=right | 2.8 km || 
|-id=433 bgcolor=#d6d6d6
| 593433 ||  || — || August 9, 2015 || Haleakala || Pan-STARRS ||  || align=right | 2.3 km || 
|-id=434 bgcolor=#d6d6d6
| 593434 ||  || — || January 19, 2012 || Kitt Peak || Spacewatch || 7:4 || align=right | 3.2 km || 
|-id=435 bgcolor=#d6d6d6
| 593435 ||  || — || July 24, 2015 || Haleakala || Pan-STARRS ||  || align=right | 2.6 km || 
|-id=436 bgcolor=#d6d6d6
| 593436 ||  || — || July 12, 2015 || Haleakala || Pan-STARRS ||  || align=right | 2.9 km || 
|-id=437 bgcolor=#d6d6d6
| 593437 ||  || — || August 9, 2015 || Haleakala || Pan-STARRS ||  || align=right | 2.5 km || 
|-id=438 bgcolor=#d6d6d6
| 593438 ||  || — || October 14, 2010 || Mount Lemmon || Mount Lemmon Survey ||  || align=right | 3.2 km || 
|-id=439 bgcolor=#d6d6d6
| 593439 ||  || — || September 21, 2004 || Anderson Mesa || LONEOS ||  || align=right | 2.8 km || 
|-id=440 bgcolor=#d6d6d6
| 593440 ||  || — || October 8, 2010 || Catalina || CSS ||  || align=right | 3.5 km || 
|-id=441 bgcolor=#d6d6d6
| 593441 ||  || — || April 26, 2003 || Kitt Peak || Spacewatch ||  || align=right | 2.6 km || 
|-id=442 bgcolor=#d6d6d6
| 593442 ||  || — || June 21, 2015 || Haleakala || Pan-STARRS ||  || align=right | 2.3 km || 
|-id=443 bgcolor=#d6d6d6
| 593443 ||  || — || May 16, 2009 || Kitt Peak || Spacewatch ||  || align=right | 2.3 km || 
|-id=444 bgcolor=#d6d6d6
| 593444 ||  || — || September 18, 2010 || Mount Lemmon || Mount Lemmon Survey ||  || align=right | 3.1 km || 
|-id=445 bgcolor=#d6d6d6
| 593445 ||  || — || December 23, 2012 || Haleakala || Pan-STARRS ||  || align=right | 2.3 km || 
|-id=446 bgcolor=#E9E9E9
| 593446 ||  || — || November 9, 2007 || Kitt Peak || Spacewatch ||  || align=right | 1.9 km || 
|-id=447 bgcolor=#d6d6d6
| 593447 ||  || — || June 26, 2015 || Haleakala || Pan-STARRS ||  || align=right | 2.5 km || 
|-id=448 bgcolor=#d6d6d6
| 593448 ||  || — || April 1, 2003 || Kitt Peak || M. W. Buie, A. B. Jordan ||  || align=right | 1.6 km || 
|-id=449 bgcolor=#d6d6d6
| 593449 ||  || — || June 26, 2015 || Haleakala || Pan-STARRS ||  || align=right | 2.1 km || 
|-id=450 bgcolor=#d6d6d6
| 593450 ||  || — || December 1, 2011 || Haleakala || Pan-STARRS ||  || align=right | 2.1 km || 
|-id=451 bgcolor=#d6d6d6
| 593451 ||  || — || December 30, 2007 || Mount Lemmon || Mount Lemmon Survey ||  || align=right | 2.7 km || 
|-id=452 bgcolor=#d6d6d6
| 593452 ||  || — || June 18, 2015 || Haleakala || Pan-STARRS ||  || align=right | 2.0 km || 
|-id=453 bgcolor=#d6d6d6
| 593453 ||  || — || June 18, 2015 || Haleakala || Pan-STARRS ||  || align=right | 1.8 km || 
|-id=454 bgcolor=#d6d6d6
| 593454 ||  || — || June 26, 2015 || Haleakala || Pan-STARRS ||  || align=right | 2.0 km || 
|-id=455 bgcolor=#d6d6d6
| 593455 ||  || — || December 17, 2012 || ESA OGS || ESA OGS ||  || align=right | 2.5 km || 
|-id=456 bgcolor=#d6d6d6
| 593456 ||  || — || July 19, 2015 || Haleakala || Pan-STARRS ||  || align=right | 2.0 km || 
|-id=457 bgcolor=#d6d6d6
| 593457 ||  || — || January 19, 2013 || Mount Lemmon || Mount Lemmon Survey ||  || align=right | 2.1 km || 
|-id=458 bgcolor=#d6d6d6
| 593458 ||  || — || August 31, 2005 || Kitt Peak || Spacewatch ||  || align=right | 2.4 km || 
|-id=459 bgcolor=#fefefe
| 593459 ||  || — || April 25, 2003 || Kitt Peak || Spacewatch ||  || align=right data-sort-value="0.70" | 700 m || 
|-id=460 bgcolor=#d6d6d6
| 593460 ||  || — || March 12, 2013 || Mount Lemmon || Mount Lemmon Survey ||  || align=right | 2.6 km || 
|-id=461 bgcolor=#d6d6d6
| 593461 ||  || — || January 18, 2013 || Kitt Peak || Spacewatch ||  || align=right | 2.5 km || 
|-id=462 bgcolor=#d6d6d6
| 593462 ||  || — || January 17, 2007 || Kitt Peak || Spacewatch ||  || align=right | 2.6 km || 
|-id=463 bgcolor=#d6d6d6
| 593463 ||  || — || October 9, 2010 || Mount Lemmon || Mount Lemmon Survey ||  || align=right | 2.3 km || 
|-id=464 bgcolor=#d6d6d6
| 593464 ||  || — || September 5, 2010 || Taunus || S. Karge, R. Kling ||  || align=right | 3.0 km || 
|-id=465 bgcolor=#d6d6d6
| 593465 ||  || — || May 10, 2014 || Haleakala || Pan-STARRS ||  || align=right | 2.4 km || 
|-id=466 bgcolor=#d6d6d6
| 593466 ||  || — || August 6, 2005 || Palomar || NEAT ||  || align=right | 3.4 km || 
|-id=467 bgcolor=#d6d6d6
| 593467 ||  || — || July 25, 2015 || Haleakala || Pan-STARRS ||  || align=right | 2.1 km || 
|-id=468 bgcolor=#d6d6d6
| 593468 ||  || — || January 17, 2013 || Mount Lemmon || Mount Lemmon Survey ||  || align=right | 2.2 km || 
|-id=469 bgcolor=#d6d6d6
| 593469 ||  || — || February 10, 2008 || Kitt Peak || Spacewatch ||  || align=right | 1.9 km || 
|-id=470 bgcolor=#d6d6d6
| 593470 ||  || — || September 3, 2010 || Mount Lemmon || Mount Lemmon Survey ||  || align=right | 2.2 km || 
|-id=471 bgcolor=#d6d6d6
| 593471 ||  || — || July 25, 2015 || Haleakala || Pan-STARRS ||  || align=right | 1.9 km || 
|-id=472 bgcolor=#d6d6d6
| 593472 ||  || — || May 11, 2014 || Mount Lemmon || Mount Lemmon Survey ||  || align=right | 2.8 km || 
|-id=473 bgcolor=#d6d6d6
| 593473 ||  || — || September 2, 2010 || Mount Lemmon || Mount Lemmon Survey ||  || align=right | 2.5 km || 
|-id=474 bgcolor=#d6d6d6
| 593474 ||  || — || April 30, 2014 || Haleakala || Pan-STARRS ||  || align=right | 2.6 km || 
|-id=475 bgcolor=#d6d6d6
| 593475 ||  || — || March 23, 2003 || Apache Point || SDSS Collaboration ||  || align=right | 2.4 km || 
|-id=476 bgcolor=#d6d6d6
| 593476 ||  || — || April 5, 2003 || Kitt Peak || Spacewatch ||  || align=right | 2.8 km || 
|-id=477 bgcolor=#d6d6d6
| 593477 ||  || — || August 10, 2015 || Haleakala || Pan-STARRS ||  || align=right | 2.7 km || 
|-id=478 bgcolor=#d6d6d6
| 593478 ||  || — || August 10, 2015 || Haleakala || Pan-STARRS ||  || align=right | 2.0 km || 
|-id=479 bgcolor=#d6d6d6
| 593479 ||  || — || April 4, 2014 || Mount Lemmon || Mount Lemmon Survey ||  || align=right | 2.1 km || 
|-id=480 bgcolor=#d6d6d6
| 593480 ||  || — || February 14, 2013 || Haleakala || Pan-STARRS ||  || align=right | 2.2 km || 
|-id=481 bgcolor=#d6d6d6
| 593481 ||  || — || June 17, 2015 || Haleakala || Pan-STARRS ||  || align=right | 2.4 km || 
|-id=482 bgcolor=#d6d6d6
| 593482 ||  || — || June 11, 2004 || Kitt Peak || Spacewatch ||  || align=right | 3.4 km || 
|-id=483 bgcolor=#d6d6d6
| 593483 ||  || — || September 17, 2010 || Mount Lemmon || Mount Lemmon Survey ||  || align=right | 2.4 km || 
|-id=484 bgcolor=#d6d6d6
| 593484 ||  || — || October 12, 1999 || Kitt Peak || Spacewatch ||  || align=right | 2.8 km || 
|-id=485 bgcolor=#d6d6d6
| 593485 ||  || — || October 23, 2011 || Haleakala || Pan-STARRS ||  || align=right | 2.4 km || 
|-id=486 bgcolor=#d6d6d6
| 593486 ||  || — || December 2, 2005 || Kitt Peak || Spacewatch ||  || align=right | 2.8 km || 
|-id=487 bgcolor=#d6d6d6
| 593487 ||  || — || July 24, 2015 || Haleakala || Pan-STARRS ||  || align=right | 2.5 km || 
|-id=488 bgcolor=#d6d6d6
| 593488 ||  || — || July 24, 2015 || Haleakala || Pan-STARRS ||  || align=right | 2.4 km || 
|-id=489 bgcolor=#d6d6d6
| 593489 ||  || — || May 14, 2008 || Mount Lemmon || Mount Lemmon Survey ||  || align=right | 4.1 km || 
|-id=490 bgcolor=#d6d6d6
| 593490 ||  || — || May 8, 2008 || Mount Lemmon || Mount Lemmon Survey ||  || align=right | 3.4 km || 
|-id=491 bgcolor=#d6d6d6
| 593491 ||  || — || October 11, 2010 || Mount Lemmon || Mount Lemmon Survey ||  || align=right | 2.2 km || 
|-id=492 bgcolor=#d6d6d6
| 593492 ||  || — || September 10, 2010 || Mount Lemmon || Mount Lemmon Survey ||  || align=right | 2.5 km || 
|-id=493 bgcolor=#d6d6d6
| 593493 ||  || — || April 12, 2013 || Haleakala || Pan-STARRS ||  || align=right | 2.7 km || 
|-id=494 bgcolor=#d6d6d6
| 593494 ||  || — || June 4, 2014 || Haleakala || Pan-STARRS ||  || align=right | 2.6 km || 
|-id=495 bgcolor=#d6d6d6
| 593495 ||  || — || May 10, 2014 || Mount Lemmon || Mount Lemmon Survey ||  || align=right | 3.0 km || 
|-id=496 bgcolor=#d6d6d6
| 593496 ||  || — || July 9, 2010 || WISE || WISE ||  || align=right | 2.7 km || 
|-id=497 bgcolor=#d6d6d6
| 593497 ||  || — || February 28, 2014 || Haleakala || Pan-STARRS ||  || align=right | 2.1 km || 
|-id=498 bgcolor=#d6d6d6
| 593498 ||  || — || April 5, 2014 || Haleakala || Pan-STARRS ||  || align=right | 2.2 km || 
|-id=499 bgcolor=#d6d6d6
| 593499 ||  || — || March 23, 2014 || Kitt Peak || Spacewatch ||  || align=right | 2.2 km || 
|-id=500 bgcolor=#d6d6d6
| 593500 ||  || — || October 24, 2011 || Haleakala || Pan-STARRS ||  || align=right | 1.8 km || 
|}

593501–593600 

|-bgcolor=#d6d6d6
| 593501 ||  || — || July 19, 2015 || Haleakala || Pan-STARRS 2 ||  || align=right | 2.6 km || 
|-id=502 bgcolor=#d6d6d6
| 593502 ||  || — || October 1, 2010 || Kitt Peak || Spacewatch ||  || align=right | 2.1 km || 
|-id=503 bgcolor=#d6d6d6
| 593503 ||  || — || March 29, 2008 || Kitt Peak || Spacewatch ||  || align=right | 2.8 km || 
|-id=504 bgcolor=#d6d6d6
| 593504 ||  || — || May 7, 2014 || Haleakala || Pan-STARRS ||  || align=right | 2.2 km || 
|-id=505 bgcolor=#d6d6d6
| 593505 ||  || — || March 20, 1998 || Kitt Peak || Spacewatch ||  || align=right | 2.6 km || 
|-id=506 bgcolor=#d6d6d6
| 593506 ||  || — || March 9, 2002 || Kitt Peak || Spacewatch ||  || align=right | 2.3 km || 
|-id=507 bgcolor=#d6d6d6
| 593507 ||  || — || December 15, 2006 || Kitt Peak || Spacewatch ||  || align=right | 3.3 km || 
|-id=508 bgcolor=#d6d6d6
| 593508 ||  || — || May 23, 2014 || Haleakala || Pan-STARRS ||  || align=right | 2.2 km || 
|-id=509 bgcolor=#d6d6d6
| 593509 ||  || — || August 11, 2015 || Haleakala || Pan-STARRS ||  || align=right | 2.3 km || 
|-id=510 bgcolor=#d6d6d6
| 593510 ||  || — || February 15, 2013 || Haleakala || Pan-STARRS ||  || align=right | 2.9 km || 
|-id=511 bgcolor=#d6d6d6
| 593511 ||  || — || February 28, 2008 || Mount Lemmon || Mount Lemmon Survey ||  || align=right | 2.2 km || 
|-id=512 bgcolor=#d6d6d6
| 593512 ||  || — || February 8, 2007 || Mount Lemmon || Mount Lemmon Survey ||  || align=right | 2.6 km || 
|-id=513 bgcolor=#d6d6d6
| 593513 ||  || — || September 17, 2010 || Mount Lemmon || Mount Lemmon Survey ||  || align=right | 2.3 km || 
|-id=514 bgcolor=#d6d6d6
| 593514 ||  || — || August 31, 2005 || Kitt Peak || Spacewatch ||  || align=right | 2.4 km || 
|-id=515 bgcolor=#d6d6d6
| 593515 ||  || — || October 30, 2010 || Mount Lemmon || Mount Lemmon Survey ||  || align=right | 2.6 km || 
|-id=516 bgcolor=#d6d6d6
| 593516 ||  || — || October 6, 2005 || Mount Lemmon || Mount Lemmon Survey ||  || align=right | 2.4 km || 
|-id=517 bgcolor=#d6d6d6
| 593517 ||  || — || December 27, 2011 || Kitt Peak || Spacewatch ||  || align=right | 2.6 km || 
|-id=518 bgcolor=#d6d6d6
| 593518 ||  || — || April 1, 2003 || Apache Point || SDSS Collaboration ||  || align=right | 2.6 km || 
|-id=519 bgcolor=#d6d6d6
| 593519 ||  || — || October 28, 2010 || Mount Lemmon || Mount Lemmon Survey ||  || align=right | 2.7 km || 
|-id=520 bgcolor=#d6d6d6
| 593520 ||  || — || November 30, 2011 || Mount Lemmon || Mount Lemmon Survey ||  || align=right | 2.5 km || 
|-id=521 bgcolor=#E9E9E9
| 593521 ||  || — || September 23, 2011 || Mount Lemmon || Mount Lemmon Survey ||  || align=right | 2.0 km || 
|-id=522 bgcolor=#d6d6d6
| 593522 ||  || — || May 7, 2014 || Haleakala || Pan-STARRS ||  || align=right | 2.2 km || 
|-id=523 bgcolor=#d6d6d6
| 593523 ||  || — || November 21, 2006 || Mount Lemmon || Mount Lemmon Survey ||  || align=right | 2.9 km || 
|-id=524 bgcolor=#d6d6d6
| 593524 ||  || — || July 24, 2015 || Haleakala || Pan-STARRS || 7:4 || align=right | 3.1 km || 
|-id=525 bgcolor=#d6d6d6
| 593525 ||  || — || July 24, 2015 || Haleakala || Pan-STARRS ||  || align=right | 2.9 km || 
|-id=526 bgcolor=#d6d6d6
| 593526 ||  || — || July 24, 2015 || Haleakala || Pan-STARRS ||  || align=right | 2.1 km || 
|-id=527 bgcolor=#d6d6d6
| 593527 ||  || — || October 2, 2005 || Mount Lemmon || Mount Lemmon Survey ||  || align=right | 2.7 km || 
|-id=528 bgcolor=#d6d6d6
| 593528 ||  || — || August 13, 2015 || Haleakala || Pan-STARRS ||  || align=right | 3.0 km || 
|-id=529 bgcolor=#d6d6d6
| 593529 ||  || — || May 7, 2014 || Haleakala || Pan-STARRS ||  || align=right | 2.6 km || 
|-id=530 bgcolor=#d6d6d6
| 593530 ||  || — || March 18, 2013 || Mount Lemmon || Mount Lemmon Survey ||  || align=right | 2.7 km || 
|-id=531 bgcolor=#d6d6d6
| 593531 ||  || — || July 10, 2004 || Palomar || NEAT ||  || align=right | 2.9 km || 
|-id=532 bgcolor=#d6d6d6
| 593532 ||  || — || July 23, 2015 || Haleakala || Pan-STARRS ||  || align=right | 2.6 km || 
|-id=533 bgcolor=#d6d6d6
| 593533 ||  || — || August 13, 2015 || Haleakala || Pan-STARRS ||  || align=right | 2.7 km || 
|-id=534 bgcolor=#d6d6d6
| 593534 ||  || — || October 13, 2010 || Mount Lemmon || Mount Lemmon Survey ||  || align=right | 2.2 km || 
|-id=535 bgcolor=#d6d6d6
| 593535 ||  || — || August 12, 2015 || Haleakala || Pan-STARRS ||  || align=right | 2.7 km || 
|-id=536 bgcolor=#d6d6d6
| 593536 ||  || — || August 10, 2015 || Haleakala || Pan-STARRS 2 ||  || align=right | 2.1 km || 
|-id=537 bgcolor=#d6d6d6
| 593537 ||  || — || July 9, 2005 || Kitt Peak || Spacewatch ||  || align=right | 2.9 km || 
|-id=538 bgcolor=#d6d6d6
| 593538 ||  || — || October 11, 2010 || Mount Lemmon || Mount Lemmon Survey ||  || align=right | 3.1 km || 
|-id=539 bgcolor=#d6d6d6
| 593539 ||  || — || July 12, 2015 || Haleakala || Pan-STARRS ||  || align=right | 3.0 km || 
|-id=540 bgcolor=#d6d6d6
| 593540 ||  || — || February 10, 2007 || Mount Lemmon || Mount Lemmon Survey ||  || align=right | 2.7 km || 
|-id=541 bgcolor=#d6d6d6
| 593541 ||  || — || October 31, 2010 || Mount Lemmon || Mount Lemmon Survey ||  || align=right | 2.7 km || 
|-id=542 bgcolor=#d6d6d6
| 593542 ||  || — || September 10, 2010 || Kitt Peak || Spacewatch ||  || align=right | 2.5 km || 
|-id=543 bgcolor=#d6d6d6
| 593543 ||  || — || February 25, 2007 || Kitt Peak || Spacewatch ||  || align=right | 2.4 km || 
|-id=544 bgcolor=#d6d6d6
| 593544 ||  || — || September 29, 2011 || Mount Lemmon || Mount Lemmon Survey ||  || align=right | 5.1 km || 
|-id=545 bgcolor=#d6d6d6
| 593545 ||  || — || August 1, 2009 || Kitt Peak || Spacewatch ||  || align=right | 3.9 km || 
|-id=546 bgcolor=#d6d6d6
| 593546 ||  || — || August 20, 2015 || Kitt Peak || Spacewatch ||  || align=right | 2.0 km || 
|-id=547 bgcolor=#d6d6d6
| 593547 ||  || — || August 21, 2015 || Haleakala || Pan-STARRS ||  || align=right | 2.3 km || 
|-id=548 bgcolor=#d6d6d6
| 593548 ||  || — || August 21, 2015 || Haleakala || Pan-STARRS ||  || align=right | 2.6 km || 
|-id=549 bgcolor=#d6d6d6
| 593549 ||  || — || August 21, 2015 || Haleakala || Pan-STARRS ||  || align=right | 2.7 km || 
|-id=550 bgcolor=#d6d6d6
| 593550 ||  || — || June 15, 2015 || Mount Lemmon || Mount Lemmon Survey ||  || align=right | 2.5 km || 
|-id=551 bgcolor=#d6d6d6
| 593551 ||  || — || April 30, 2014 || Haleakala || Pan-STARRS ||  || align=right | 2.4 km || 
|-id=552 bgcolor=#d6d6d6
| 593552 ||  || — || February 6, 2007 || Mount Lemmon || Mount Lemmon Survey ||  || align=right | 2.7 km || 
|-id=553 bgcolor=#d6d6d6
| 593553 ||  || — || September 29, 2005 || Kitt Peak || Spacewatch ||  || align=right | 1.9 km || 
|-id=554 bgcolor=#d6d6d6
| 593554 ||  || — || July 14, 2015 || Haleakala || Pan-STARRS ||  || align=right | 2.7 km || 
|-id=555 bgcolor=#d6d6d6
| 593555 ||  || — || May 9, 2014 || Haleakala || Pan-STARRS ||  || align=right | 2.5 km || 
|-id=556 bgcolor=#d6d6d6
| 593556 ||  || — || September 29, 2010 || Mount Lemmon || Mount Lemmon Survey ||  || align=right | 2.4 km || 
|-id=557 bgcolor=#d6d6d6
| 593557 ||  || — || September 3, 2010 || Mount Lemmon || Mount Lemmon Survey ||  || align=right | 3.2 km || 
|-id=558 bgcolor=#d6d6d6
| 593558 ||  || — || July 23, 2015 || Haleakala || Pan-STARRS ||  || align=right | 2.6 km || 
|-id=559 bgcolor=#d6d6d6
| 593559 ||  || — || August 17, 2009 || Catalina || CSS ||  || align=right | 3.3 km || 
|-id=560 bgcolor=#d6d6d6
| 593560 ||  || — || July 25, 2015 || Haleakala || Pan-STARRS ||  || align=right | 3.5 km || 
|-id=561 bgcolor=#d6d6d6
| 593561 ||  || — || April 5, 2014 || Haleakala || Pan-STARRS ||  || align=right | 2.3 km || 
|-id=562 bgcolor=#d6d6d6
| 593562 ||  || — || September 6, 2015 || Kitt Peak || Spacewatch ||  || align=right | 2.5 km || 
|-id=563 bgcolor=#d6d6d6
| 593563 ||  || — || November 2, 2005 || Mount Lemmon || Mount Lemmon Survey ||  || align=right | 2.5 km || 
|-id=564 bgcolor=#d6d6d6
| 593564 ||  || — || August 16, 2009 || Catalina || CSS ||  || align=right | 2.5 km || 
|-id=565 bgcolor=#d6d6d6
| 593565 ||  || — || July 25, 2015 || Haleakala || Pan-STARRS ||  || align=right | 2.5 km || 
|-id=566 bgcolor=#d6d6d6
| 593566 ||  || — || September 13, 2004 || Socorro || LINEAR ||  || align=right | 2.4 km || 
|-id=567 bgcolor=#d6d6d6
| 593567 ||  || — || April 21, 2003 || Kitt Peak || Spacewatch ||  || align=right | 3.3 km || 
|-id=568 bgcolor=#d6d6d6
| 593568 ||  || — || April 6, 2014 || Kitt Peak || Spacewatch ||  || align=right | 2.5 km || 
|-id=569 bgcolor=#d6d6d6
| 593569 ||  || — || February 23, 2007 || Mount Lemmon || Mount Lemmon Survey ||  || align=right | 2.8 km || 
|-id=570 bgcolor=#d6d6d6
| 593570 ||  || — || August 15, 2009 || Kitt Peak || Spacewatch ||  || align=right | 2.7 km || 
|-id=571 bgcolor=#d6d6d6
| 593571 ||  || — || September 17, 2004 || Drebach || A. Knöfel ||  || align=right | 3.0 km || 
|-id=572 bgcolor=#d6d6d6
| 593572 ||  || — || January 22, 2012 || Haleakala || Pan-STARRS ||  || align=right | 2.8 km || 
|-id=573 bgcolor=#d6d6d6
| 593573 ||  || — || February 21, 2007 || Kitt Peak || Spacewatch ||  || align=right | 2.2 km || 
|-id=574 bgcolor=#d6d6d6
| 593574 ||  || — || August 15, 2009 || Kitt Peak || Spacewatch ||  || align=right | 2.1 km || 
|-id=575 bgcolor=#d6d6d6
| 593575 ||  || — || November 15, 2010 || Mount Lemmon || Mount Lemmon Survey ||  || align=right | 2.3 km || 
|-id=576 bgcolor=#d6d6d6
| 593576 ||  || — || October 29, 2010 || Mount Lemmon || Mount Lemmon Survey ||  || align=right | 2.4 km || 
|-id=577 bgcolor=#d6d6d6
| 593577 ||  || — || June 26, 2015 || Haleakala || Pan-STARRS ||  || align=right | 2.4 km || 
|-id=578 bgcolor=#d6d6d6
| 593578 ||  || — || July 23, 2015 || Haleakala || Pan-STARRS ||  || align=right | 2.5 km || 
|-id=579 bgcolor=#d6d6d6
| 593579 ||  || — || March 13, 2013 || Haleakala || Pan-STARRS ||  || align=right | 2.7 km || 
|-id=580 bgcolor=#d6d6d6
| 593580 ||  || — || March 16, 2013 || Kitt Peak || Spacewatch ||  || align=right | 2.4 km || 
|-id=581 bgcolor=#d6d6d6
| 593581 ||  || — || September 10, 2004 || Socorro || LINEAR ||  || align=right | 2.8 km || 
|-id=582 bgcolor=#d6d6d6
| 593582 ||  || — || August 13, 2004 || Palomar || NEAT ||  || align=right | 3.8 km || 
|-id=583 bgcolor=#d6d6d6
| 593583 ||  || — || October 11, 2010 || Mount Lemmon || Mount Lemmon Survey ||  || align=right | 2.7 km || 
|-id=584 bgcolor=#d6d6d6
| 593584 ||  || — || August 15, 2009 || Catalina || CSS ||  || align=right | 3.5 km || 
|-id=585 bgcolor=#d6d6d6
| 593585 ||  || — || February 19, 2007 || Mount Lemmon || Mount Lemmon Survey ||  || align=right | 3.8 km || 
|-id=586 bgcolor=#d6d6d6
| 593586 ||  || — || March 6, 2013 || Haleakala || Pan-STARRS ||  || align=right | 2.7 km || 
|-id=587 bgcolor=#d6d6d6
| 593587 ||  || — || February 21, 2007 || Mount Lemmon || Mount Lemmon Survey ||  || align=right | 2.3 km || 
|-id=588 bgcolor=#d6d6d6
| 593588 ||  || — || September 14, 1998 || Kitt Peak || Spacewatch ||  || align=right | 2.7 km || 
|-id=589 bgcolor=#d6d6d6
| 593589 ||  || — || April 14, 2008 || Mount Lemmon || Mount Lemmon Survey ||  || align=right | 2.4 km || 
|-id=590 bgcolor=#d6d6d6
| 593590 ||  || — || April 5, 2008 || Mount Lemmon || Mount Lemmon Survey ||  || align=right | 2.7 km || 
|-id=591 bgcolor=#d6d6d6
| 593591 ||  || — || January 5, 2006 || Kitt Peak || Spacewatch ||  || align=right | 2.8 km || 
|-id=592 bgcolor=#d6d6d6
| 593592 ||  || — || October 4, 1999 || Kitt Peak || Spacewatch ||  || align=right | 2.9 km || 
|-id=593 bgcolor=#d6d6d6
| 593593 ||  || — || January 29, 2012 || Mount Lemmon || Mount Lemmon Survey ||  || align=right | 3.9 km || 
|-id=594 bgcolor=#d6d6d6
| 593594 ||  || — || November 16, 2010 || Mount Lemmon || Mount Lemmon Survey ||  || align=right | 2.8 km || 
|-id=595 bgcolor=#d6d6d6
| 593595 ||  || — || August 21, 2015 || Haleakala || Pan-STARRS ||  || align=right | 2.2 km || 
|-id=596 bgcolor=#d6d6d6
| 593596 ||  || — || October 31, 2010 || Mount Lemmon || Mount Lemmon Survey ||  || align=right | 2.0 km || 
|-id=597 bgcolor=#d6d6d6
| 593597 ||  || — || September 9, 2015 || Haleakala || Pan-STARRS ||  || align=right | 2.1 km || 
|-id=598 bgcolor=#d6d6d6
| 593598 ||  || — || March 8, 2013 || Haleakala || Pan-STARRS ||  || align=right | 2.5 km || 
|-id=599 bgcolor=#d6d6d6
| 593599 ||  || — || April 7, 2007 || Mount Lemmon || Mount Lemmon Survey ||  || align=right | 3.0 km || 
|-id=600 bgcolor=#d6d6d6
| 593600 ||  || — || October 7, 2004 || Kitt Peak || Spacewatch ||  || align=right | 1.9 km || 
|}

593601–593700 

|-bgcolor=#d6d6d6
| 593601 ||  || — || March 15, 2007 || Kitt Peak || Spacewatch ||  || align=right | 2.7 km || 
|-id=602 bgcolor=#d6d6d6
| 593602 ||  || — || September 13, 2005 || Kitt Peak || Spacewatch ||  || align=right | 2.4 km || 
|-id=603 bgcolor=#d6d6d6
| 593603 ||  || — || August 23, 2004 || Kitt Peak || Spacewatch ||  || align=right | 2.4 km || 
|-id=604 bgcolor=#d6d6d6
| 593604 ||  || — || February 25, 2007 || Kitt Peak || Spacewatch ||  || align=right | 2.5 km || 
|-id=605 bgcolor=#d6d6d6
| 593605 ||  || — || September 11, 2015 || Haleakala || Pan-STARRS ||  || align=right | 2.8 km || 
|-id=606 bgcolor=#d6d6d6
| 593606 ||  || — || July 29, 2009 || Kitt Peak || Spacewatch ||  || align=right | 2.3 km || 
|-id=607 bgcolor=#d6d6d6
| 593607 ||  || — || February 27, 2012 || Haleakala || Pan-STARRS ||  || align=right | 3.0 km || 
|-id=608 bgcolor=#d6d6d6
| 593608 ||  || — || July 25, 2015 || Haleakala || Pan-STARRS ||  || align=right | 2.8 km || 
|-id=609 bgcolor=#d6d6d6
| 593609 ||  || — || June 26, 2015 || Haleakala || Pan-STARRS ||  || align=right | 3.1 km || 
|-id=610 bgcolor=#d6d6d6
| 593610 ||  || — || August 8, 2004 || Palomar || NEAT ||  || align=right | 2.9 km || 
|-id=611 bgcolor=#d6d6d6
| 593611 ||  || — || November 9, 2009 || Mount Lemmon || Mount Lemmon Survey || 7:4 || align=right | 2.7 km || 
|-id=612 bgcolor=#d6d6d6
| 593612 ||  || — || May 8, 2014 || Haleakala || Pan-STARRS ||  || align=right | 2.0 km || 
|-id=613 bgcolor=#d6d6d6
| 593613 ||  || — || November 14, 2010 || Kitt Peak || Spacewatch ||  || align=right | 2.4 km || 
|-id=614 bgcolor=#d6d6d6
| 593614 ||  || — || September 11, 2015 || Haleakala || Pan-STARRS ||  || align=right | 2.7 km || 
|-id=615 bgcolor=#d6d6d6
| 593615 ||  || — || February 17, 2013 || Mount Lemmon || Mount Lemmon Survey ||  || align=right | 2.9 km || 
|-id=616 bgcolor=#C2E0FF
| 593616 ||  || — || June 23, 2015 || Mauna Kea || Mauna Kea Obs. || cubewano (hot)critical || align=right | 168 km || 
|-id=617 bgcolor=#C2E0FF
| 593617 ||  || — || August 9, 2005 || Cerro Tololo || Cerro Tololo Obs. || res4:5critical || align=right | 88 km || 
|-id=618 bgcolor=#d6d6d6
| 593618 ||  || — || September 12, 2015 || Haleakala || Pan-STARRS ||  || align=right | 3.2 km || 
|-id=619 bgcolor=#d6d6d6
| 593619 ||  || — || September 11, 2015 || Haleakala || Pan-STARRS ||  || align=right | 2.4 km || 
|-id=620 bgcolor=#d6d6d6
| 593620 ||  || — || September 11, 2015 || Haleakala || Pan-STARRS ||  || align=right | 2.0 km || 
|-id=621 bgcolor=#d6d6d6
| 593621 ||  || — || July 23, 2003 || Palomar || NEAT ||  || align=right | 3.6 km || 
|-id=622 bgcolor=#d6d6d6
| 593622 ||  || — || September 18, 2015 || Catalina || CSS ||  || align=right | 3.0 km || 
|-id=623 bgcolor=#d6d6d6
| 593623 ||  || — || August 21, 2015 || Haleakala || Pan-STARRS ||  || align=right | 2.4 km || 
|-id=624 bgcolor=#d6d6d6
| 593624 ||  || — || November 28, 2010 || Catalina || CSS ||  || align=right | 3.1 km || 
|-id=625 bgcolor=#d6d6d6
| 593625 ||  || — || September 23, 2015 || Haleakala || Pan-STARRS ||  || align=right | 2.4 km || 
|-id=626 bgcolor=#d6d6d6
| 593626 ||  || — || September 23, 2015 || Haleakala || Pan-STARRS ||  || align=right | 2.3 km || 
|-id=627 bgcolor=#d6d6d6
| 593627 ||  || — || March 15, 2012 || Mount Lemmon || Mount Lemmon Survey ||  || align=right | 2.6 km || 
|-id=628 bgcolor=#d6d6d6
| 593628 ||  || — || December 24, 2011 || Mount Lemmon || Mount Lemmon Survey ||  || align=right | 2.9 km || 
|-id=629 bgcolor=#d6d6d6
| 593629 ||  || — || October 28, 2005 || Kitt Peak || Spacewatch ||  || align=right | 3.4 km || 
|-id=630 bgcolor=#d6d6d6
| 593630 ||  || — || December 10, 2005 || Kitt Peak || Spacewatch ||  || align=right | 3.1 km || 
|-id=631 bgcolor=#d6d6d6
| 593631 ||  || — || January 27, 2007 || Kitt Peak || Spacewatch ||  || align=right | 3.3 km || 
|-id=632 bgcolor=#d6d6d6
| 593632 ||  || — || November 2, 2010 || Mount Lemmon || Mount Lemmon Survey ||  || align=right | 2.6 km || 
|-id=633 bgcolor=#d6d6d6
| 593633 ||  || — || August 25, 2004 || Kitt Peak || Spacewatch ||  || align=right | 2.2 km || 
|-id=634 bgcolor=#d6d6d6
| 593634 ||  || — || May 28, 2014 || Mount Lemmon || Mount Lemmon Survey ||  || align=right | 2.7 km || 
|-id=635 bgcolor=#d6d6d6
| 593635 ||  || — || May 21, 2014 || Haleakala || Pan-STARRS ||  || align=right | 2.2 km || 
|-id=636 bgcolor=#d6d6d6
| 593636 ||  || — || October 11, 2010 || Mount Lemmon || Mount Lemmon Survey ||  || align=right | 2.9 km || 
|-id=637 bgcolor=#d6d6d6
| 593637 ||  || — || March 13, 1996 || Kitt Peak || Spacewatch ||  || align=right | 2.7 km || 
|-id=638 bgcolor=#d6d6d6
| 593638 ||  || — || August 12, 2015 || Haleakala || Pan-STARRS ||  || align=right | 2.3 km || 
|-id=639 bgcolor=#d6d6d6
| 593639 ||  || — || December 24, 2005 || Kitt Peak || Spacewatch ||  || align=right | 2.7 km || 
|-id=640 bgcolor=#d6d6d6
| 593640 ||  || — || May 25, 2014 || Haleakala || Pan-STARRS ||  || align=right | 2.8 km || 
|-id=641 bgcolor=#d6d6d6
| 593641 ||  || — || May 5, 2014 || Haleakala || Pan-STARRS ||  || align=right | 2.7 km || 
|-id=642 bgcolor=#d6d6d6
| 593642 ||  || — || May 10, 2014 || Kitt Peak || Spacewatch ||  || align=right | 2.4 km || 
|-id=643 bgcolor=#d6d6d6
| 593643 ||  || — || October 8, 2015 || Haleakala || Pan-STARRS || 7:4 || align=right | 2.9 km || 
|-id=644 bgcolor=#d6d6d6
| 593644 ||  || — || July 7, 2014 || Haleakala || Pan-STARRS ||  || align=right | 3.0 km || 
|-id=645 bgcolor=#d6d6d6
| 593645 ||  || — || May 28, 2014 || Haleakala || Pan-STARRS ||  || align=right | 2.3 km || 
|-id=646 bgcolor=#d6d6d6
| 593646 ||  || — || December 8, 2005 || Kitt Peak || Spacewatch ||  || align=right | 3.1 km || 
|-id=647 bgcolor=#d6d6d6
| 593647 ||  || — || November 12, 2010 || Mount Lemmon || Mount Lemmon Survey ||  || align=right | 2.5 km || 
|-id=648 bgcolor=#d6d6d6
| 593648 ||  || — || November 26, 2005 || Kitt Peak || Spacewatch ||  || align=right | 3.2 km || 
|-id=649 bgcolor=#d6d6d6
| 593649 ||  || — || November 3, 2010 || Mount Lemmon || Mount Lemmon Survey ||  || align=right | 3.0 km || 
|-id=650 bgcolor=#E9E9E9
| 593650 ||  || — || September 17, 2006 || Kitt Peak || Spacewatch ||  || align=right | 1.7 km || 
|-id=651 bgcolor=#d6d6d6
| 593651 ||  || — || February 23, 2007 || Mount Lemmon || Mount Lemmon Survey ||  || align=right | 2.4 km || 
|-id=652 bgcolor=#d6d6d6
| 593652 ||  || — || December 21, 2005 || Kitt Peak || Spacewatch ||  || align=right | 3.5 km || 
|-id=653 bgcolor=#d6d6d6
| 593653 ||  || — || October 17, 2010 || Mount Lemmon || Mount Lemmon Survey ||  || align=right | 3.0 km || 
|-id=654 bgcolor=#d6d6d6
| 593654 ||  || — || May 7, 2008 || Kitt Peak || Spacewatch ||  || align=right | 2.6 km || 
|-id=655 bgcolor=#d6d6d6
| 593655 ||  || — || April 10, 2013 || Haleakala || Pan-STARRS ||  || align=right | 2.7 km || 
|-id=656 bgcolor=#d6d6d6
| 593656 ||  || — || July 25, 2015 || Haleakala || Pan-STARRS ||  || align=right | 2.5 km || 
|-id=657 bgcolor=#d6d6d6
| 593657 ||  || — || April 26, 2007 || Kitt Peak || Spacewatch ||  || align=right | 3.4 km || 
|-id=658 bgcolor=#fefefe
| 593658 ||  || — || April 12, 2004 || Kitt Peak || Spacewatch ||  || align=right data-sort-value="0.59" | 590 m || 
|-id=659 bgcolor=#E9E9E9
| 593659 ||  || — || October 2, 2006 || Mount Lemmon || Mount Lemmon Survey ||  || align=right | 1.4 km || 
|-id=660 bgcolor=#d6d6d6
| 593660 ||  || — || January 23, 2011 || Mount Lemmon || Mount Lemmon Survey ||  || align=right | 2.4 km || 
|-id=661 bgcolor=#d6d6d6
| 593661 ||  || — || May 11, 2007 || Mount Lemmon || Mount Lemmon Survey ||  || align=right | 3.7 km || 
|-id=662 bgcolor=#d6d6d6
| 593662 ||  || — || December 16, 2004 || Kitt Peak || Spacewatch ||  || align=right | 2.7 km || 
|-id=663 bgcolor=#d6d6d6
| 593663 ||  || — || July 25, 2015 || Haleakala || Pan-STARRS ||  || align=right | 2.7 km || 
|-id=664 bgcolor=#d6d6d6
| 593664 ||  || — || April 6, 2013 || Mount Lemmon || Mount Lemmon Survey ||  || align=right | 2.6 km || 
|-id=665 bgcolor=#d6d6d6
| 593665 ||  || — || November 15, 2006 || Kitt Peak || Spacewatch ||  || align=right | 2.4 km || 
|-id=666 bgcolor=#d6d6d6
| 593666 ||  || — || October 15, 2004 || Kitt Peak || Spacewatch ||  || align=right | 3.4 km || 
|-id=667 bgcolor=#d6d6d6
| 593667 ||  || — || February 13, 2008 || Mount Lemmon || Mount Lemmon Survey ||  || align=right | 2.5 km || 
|-id=668 bgcolor=#d6d6d6
| 593668 ||  || — || September 16, 2010 || Kitt Peak || Spacewatch ||  || align=right | 2.8 km || 
|-id=669 bgcolor=#d6d6d6
| 593669 ||  || — || August 18, 2009 || Kitt Peak || Spacewatch ||  || align=right | 3.0 km || 
|-id=670 bgcolor=#d6d6d6
| 593670 ||  || — || October 14, 2010 || Mount Lemmon || Mount Lemmon Survey ||  || align=right | 2.6 km || 
|-id=671 bgcolor=#d6d6d6
| 593671 ||  || — || December 11, 2010 || Mount Lemmon || Mount Lemmon Survey ||  || align=right | 2.9 km || 
|-id=672 bgcolor=#d6d6d6
| 593672 ||  || — || October 4, 2004 || Kitt Peak || Spacewatch ||  || align=right | 2.4 km || 
|-id=673 bgcolor=#d6d6d6
| 593673 ||  || — || February 17, 2007 || Mount Lemmon || Mount Lemmon Survey ||  || align=right | 2.9 km || 
|-id=674 bgcolor=#d6d6d6
| 593674 ||  || — || April 14, 2007 || Mount Lemmon || Mount Lemmon Survey || Tj (2.95) || align=right | 4.5 km || 
|-id=675 bgcolor=#d6d6d6
| 593675 ||  || — || September 20, 2003 || Kitt Peak || Spacewatch ||  || align=right | 3.8 km || 
|-id=676 bgcolor=#d6d6d6
| 593676 ||  || — || October 7, 2004 || Kitt Peak || Spacewatch ||  || align=right | 3.7 km || 
|-id=677 bgcolor=#d6d6d6
| 593677 ||  || — || November 17, 2010 || Mount Lemmon || Mount Lemmon Survey || LIX || align=right | 3.0 km || 
|-id=678 bgcolor=#d6d6d6
| 593678 ||  || — || June 24, 2009 || Mount Lemmon || Mount Lemmon Survey ||  || align=right | 3.6 km || 
|-id=679 bgcolor=#d6d6d6
| 593679 ||  || — || December 7, 2005 || Kitt Peak || Spacewatch ||  || align=right | 3.2 km || 
|-id=680 bgcolor=#d6d6d6
| 593680 ||  || — || October 10, 2015 || Oukaimeden || C. Rinner ||  || align=right | 2.6 km || 
|-id=681 bgcolor=#d6d6d6
| 593681 ||  || — || August 20, 2003 || Palomar || NEAT ||  || align=right | 3.9 km || 
|-id=682 bgcolor=#d6d6d6
| 593682 ||  || — || February 19, 2002 || Kitt Peak || Spacewatch ||  || align=right | 2.7 km || 
|-id=683 bgcolor=#d6d6d6
| 593683 ||  || — || September 25, 2015 || Mount Lemmon || Mount Lemmon Survey ||  || align=right | 2.4 km || 
|-id=684 bgcolor=#d6d6d6
| 593684 ||  || — || August 20, 2009 || Kitt Peak || Spacewatch ||  || align=right | 3.3 km || 
|-id=685 bgcolor=#d6d6d6
| 593685 ||  || — || September 16, 2004 || Socorro || LINEAR ||  || align=right | 3.3 km || 
|-id=686 bgcolor=#d6d6d6
| 593686 ||  || — || February 27, 2006 || Mount Lemmon || Mount Lemmon Survey ||  || align=right | 2.8 km || 
|-id=687 bgcolor=#d6d6d6
| 593687 ||  || — || November 12, 2010 || Kitt Peak || Spacewatch ||  || align=right | 2.6 km || 
|-id=688 bgcolor=#d6d6d6
| 593688 ||  || — || September 4, 2010 || Kitt Peak || Spacewatch ||  || align=right | 3.1 km || 
|-id=689 bgcolor=#d6d6d6
| 593689 ||  || — || February 16, 2012 || Haleakala || Pan-STARRS ||  || align=right | 3.1 km || 
|-id=690 bgcolor=#d6d6d6
| 593690 ||  || — || October 19, 1999 || Kitt Peak || Spacewatch ||  || align=right | 2.2 km || 
|-id=691 bgcolor=#fefefe
| 593691 ||  || — || March 16, 2007 || Mount Lemmon || Mount Lemmon Survey ||  || align=right data-sort-value="0.65" | 650 m || 
|-id=692 bgcolor=#d6d6d6
| 593692 ||  || — || September 6, 2015 || Haleakala || Pan-STARRS ||  || align=right | 2.7 km || 
|-id=693 bgcolor=#E9E9E9
| 593693 ||  || — || September 15, 2006 || Kitt Peak || Spacewatch ||  || align=right | 1.0 km || 
|-id=694 bgcolor=#d6d6d6
| 593694 ||  || — || March 16, 2012 || Haleakala || Pan-STARRS ||  || align=right | 3.0 km || 
|-id=695 bgcolor=#d6d6d6
| 593695 ||  || — || October 3, 2015 || Catalina || CSS || Tj (2.98) || align=right | 3.3 km || 
|-id=696 bgcolor=#d6d6d6
| 593696 ||  || — || October 12, 2015 || Haleakala || Pan-STARRS ||  || align=right | 3.1 km || 
|-id=697 bgcolor=#d6d6d6
| 593697 ||  || — || October 9, 2010 || Mount Lemmon || Mount Lemmon Survey ||  || align=right | 3.1 km || 
|-id=698 bgcolor=#d6d6d6
| 593698 ||  || — || February 18, 2013 || Kitt Peak || Spacewatch ||  || align=right | 3.3 km || 
|-id=699 bgcolor=#d6d6d6
| 593699 ||  || — || October 12, 2015 || Haleakala || Pan-STARRS ||  || align=right | 2.3 km || 
|-id=700 bgcolor=#d6d6d6
| 593700 ||  || — || February 2, 2001 || Kitt Peak || Spacewatch ||  || align=right | 2.8 km || 
|}

593701–593800 

|-bgcolor=#d6d6d6
| 593701 ||  || — || February 24, 2012 || Mount Lemmon || Mount Lemmon Survey ||  || align=right | 2.4 km || 
|-id=702 bgcolor=#d6d6d6
| 593702 ||  || — || September 24, 2015 || Catalina || CSS ||  || align=right | 2.6 km || 
|-id=703 bgcolor=#d6d6d6
| 593703 ||  || — || November 1, 2005 || Mount Lemmon || Mount Lemmon Survey ||  || align=right | 2.8 km || 
|-id=704 bgcolor=#d6d6d6
| 593704 ||  || — || February 28, 2006 || Catalina || CSS || Tj (2.99) || align=right | 3.3 km || 
|-id=705 bgcolor=#d6d6d6
| 593705 ||  || — || September 20, 2009 || Mount Lemmon || Mount Lemmon Survey ||  || align=right | 3.2 km || 
|-id=706 bgcolor=#d6d6d6
| 593706 ||  || — || November 6, 2010 || Mount Lemmon || Mount Lemmon Survey ||  || align=right | 3.0 km || 
|-id=707 bgcolor=#d6d6d6
| 593707 ||  || — || November 15, 2010 || Mount Lemmon || Mount Lemmon Survey ||  || align=right | 2.6 km || 
|-id=708 bgcolor=#d6d6d6
| 593708 ||  || — || August 20, 2009 || Kitt Peak || Spacewatch ||  || align=right | 2.7 km || 
|-id=709 bgcolor=#d6d6d6
| 593709 ||  || — || October 3, 2015 || Catalina || CSS ||  || align=right | 2.2 km || 
|-id=710 bgcolor=#d6d6d6
| 593710 ||  || — || December 10, 2004 || Socorro || LINEAR ||  || align=right | 3.5 km || 
|-id=711 bgcolor=#fefefe
| 593711 ||  || — || January 19, 2004 || Kitt Peak || Spacewatch ||  || align=right data-sort-value="0.43" | 430 m || 
|-id=712 bgcolor=#d6d6d6
| 593712 ||  || — || November 4, 2004 || Kitt Peak || Spacewatch ||  || align=right | 3.7 km || 
|-id=713 bgcolor=#d6d6d6
| 593713 ||  || — || March 13, 2007 || Kitt Peak || Spacewatch ||  || align=right | 2.6 km || 
|-id=714 bgcolor=#d6d6d6
| 593714 ||  || — || April 25, 2007 || Kitt Peak || Spacewatch ||  || align=right | 2.6 km || 
|-id=715 bgcolor=#d6d6d6
| 593715 ||  || — || October 30, 2005 || Mount Lemmon || Mount Lemmon Survey ||  || align=right | 3.1 km || 
|-id=716 bgcolor=#d6d6d6
| 593716 ||  || — || August 21, 2015 || Haleakala || Pan-STARRS ||  || align=right | 2.7 km || 
|-id=717 bgcolor=#d6d6d6
| 593717 ||  || — || May 5, 2013 || Haleakala || Pan-STARRS ||  || align=right | 3.2 km || 
|-id=718 bgcolor=#d6d6d6
| 593718 ||  || — || October 9, 2015 || Haleakala || Pan-STARRS || 7:4 || align=right | 3.5 km || 
|-id=719 bgcolor=#d6d6d6
| 593719 ||  || — || September 19, 2009 || Mount Lemmon || Mount Lemmon Survey ||  || align=right | 2.5 km || 
|-id=720 bgcolor=#d6d6d6
| 593720 ||  || — || September 28, 2009 || Mount Lemmon || Mount Lemmon Survey ||  || align=right | 2.6 km || 
|-id=721 bgcolor=#fefefe
| 593721 ||  || — || May 21, 2014 || Haleakala || Pan-STARRS ||  || align=right data-sort-value="0.47" | 470 m || 
|-id=722 bgcolor=#d6d6d6
| 593722 ||  || — || October 13, 2015 || Haleakala || Pan-STARRS ||  || align=right | 2.5 km || 
|-id=723 bgcolor=#d6d6d6
| 593723 ||  || — || October 9, 2015 || ISON-SSO || L. Elenin ||  || align=right | 3.2 km || 
|-id=724 bgcolor=#fefefe
| 593724 ||  || — || October 9, 2015 || Haleakala || Pan-STARRS ||  || align=right data-sort-value="0.59" | 590 m || 
|-id=725 bgcolor=#d6d6d6
| 593725 ||  || — || October 8, 2015 || Catalina || CSS ||  || align=right | 2.5 km || 
|-id=726 bgcolor=#d6d6d6
| 593726 ||  || — || October 1, 2015 || Mount Lemmon || Mount Lemmon Survey ||  || align=right | 2.4 km || 
|-id=727 bgcolor=#d6d6d6
| 593727 ||  || — || October 15, 2015 || Haleakala || Pan-STARRS ||  || align=right | 1.9 km || 
|-id=728 bgcolor=#d6d6d6
| 593728 ||  || — || September 5, 2010 || Mount Lemmon || Mount Lemmon Survey ||  || align=right | 2.8 km || 
|-id=729 bgcolor=#d6d6d6
| 593729 ||  || — || December 6, 2010 || Mount Lemmon || Mount Lemmon Survey ||  || align=right | 2.4 km || 
|-id=730 bgcolor=#d6d6d6
| 593730 ||  || — || October 10, 2015 || Kitt Peak || Spacewatch ||  || align=right | 2.3 km || 
|-id=731 bgcolor=#d6d6d6
| 593731 ||  || — || August 17, 2009 || Kitt Peak || Spacewatch ||  || align=right | 2.6 km || 
|-id=732 bgcolor=#d6d6d6
| 593732 ||  || — || September 29, 2005 || Mount Lemmon || Mount Lemmon Survey ||  || align=right | 1.8 km || 
|-id=733 bgcolor=#d6d6d6
| 593733 ||  || — || June 26, 2015 || Haleakala || Pan-STARRS ||  || align=right | 2.9 km || 
|-id=734 bgcolor=#FA8072
| 593734 ||  || — || September 25, 1998 || Kitt Peak || Spacewatch ||  || align=right data-sort-value="0.58" | 580 m || 
|-id=735 bgcolor=#d6d6d6
| 593735 ||  || — || November 2, 2010 || Kitt Peak || Spacewatch ||  || align=right | 2.4 km || 
|-id=736 bgcolor=#d6d6d6
| 593736 ||  || — || March 2, 2008 || Mount Lemmon || Mount Lemmon Survey ||  || align=right | 3.2 km || 
|-id=737 bgcolor=#d6d6d6
| 593737 ||  || — || October 22, 2015 || Haleakala || Pan-STARRS ||  || align=right | 2.4 km || 
|-id=738 bgcolor=#d6d6d6
| 593738 ||  || — || October 22, 2015 || Haleakala || Pan-STARRS ||  || align=right | 2.1 km || 
|-id=739 bgcolor=#d6d6d6
| 593739 ||  || — || December 2, 2010 || Mount Lemmon || Mount Lemmon Survey ||  || align=right | 2.4 km || 
|-id=740 bgcolor=#d6d6d6
| 593740 ||  || — || April 10, 2013 || Haleakala || Pan-STARRS ||  || align=right | 2.4 km || 
|-id=741 bgcolor=#d6d6d6
| 593741 ||  || — || November 15, 2010 || Mount Lemmon || Mount Lemmon Survey ||  || align=right | 3.0 km || 
|-id=742 bgcolor=#d6d6d6
| 593742 ||  || — || November 6, 2010 || Mount Lemmon || Mount Lemmon Survey ||  || align=right | 2.8 km || 
|-id=743 bgcolor=#d6d6d6
| 593743 ||  || — || September 18, 2015 || Mount Lemmon || Mount Lemmon Survey ||  || align=right | 2.4 km || 
|-id=744 bgcolor=#d6d6d6
| 593744 ||  || — || September 12, 2015 || Haleakala || Pan-STARRS ||  || align=right | 2.4 km || 
|-id=745 bgcolor=#d6d6d6
| 593745 ||  || — || February 27, 2012 || Haleakala || Pan-STARRS ||  || align=right | 2.7 km || 
|-id=746 bgcolor=#d6d6d6
| 593746 ||  || — || September 15, 2009 || Catalina || CSS ||  || align=right | 2.6 km || 
|-id=747 bgcolor=#d6d6d6
| 593747 ||  || — || June 7, 2013 || Haleakala || Pan-STARRS ||  || align=right | 3.0 km || 
|-id=748 bgcolor=#d6d6d6
| 593748 ||  || — || October 11, 2004 || Kitt Peak || Spacewatch ||  || align=right | 3.0 km || 
|-id=749 bgcolor=#d6d6d6
| 593749 ||  || — || December 1, 2005 || Mount Lemmon || Mount Lemmon Survey ||  || align=right | 2.5 km || 
|-id=750 bgcolor=#d6d6d6
| 593750 ||  || — || February 15, 2013 || Haleakala || Pan-STARRS ||  || align=right | 2.6 km || 
|-id=751 bgcolor=#d6d6d6
| 593751 ||  || — || August 25, 2004 || Kitt Peak || Spacewatch ||  || align=right | 2.7 km || 
|-id=752 bgcolor=#d6d6d6
| 593752 ||  || — || October 17, 2010 || Mount Lemmon || Mount Lemmon Survey ||  || align=right | 2.7 km || 
|-id=753 bgcolor=#d6d6d6
| 593753 ||  || — || August 22, 2004 || Kitt Peak || Spacewatch ||  || align=right | 2.6 km || 
|-id=754 bgcolor=#d6d6d6
| 593754 ||  || — || October 17, 2010 || Mount Lemmon || Mount Lemmon Survey ||  || align=right | 2.9 km || 
|-id=755 bgcolor=#d6d6d6
| 593755 ||  || — || February 22, 2007 || Kitt Peak || Spacewatch ||  || align=right | 2.9 km || 
|-id=756 bgcolor=#d6d6d6
| 593756 ||  || — || October 29, 2010 || Mount Lemmon || Mount Lemmon Survey || Tj (2.93) || align=right | 3.0 km || 
|-id=757 bgcolor=#d6d6d6
| 593757 ||  || — || December 2, 2010 || Kitt Peak || Spacewatch ||  || align=right | 2.4 km || 
|-id=758 bgcolor=#d6d6d6
| 593758 ||  || — || February 27, 2012 || Haleakala || Pan-STARRS || 7:4 || align=right | 2.6 km || 
|-id=759 bgcolor=#d6d6d6
| 593759 ||  || — || November 2, 2010 || Kitt Peak || Spacewatch ||  || align=right | 2.9 km || 
|-id=760 bgcolor=#d6d6d6
| 593760 ||  || — || December 2, 2010 || Mount Lemmon || Mount Lemmon Survey ||  || align=right | 2.8 km || 
|-id=761 bgcolor=#d6d6d6
| 593761 ||  || — || June 27, 2014 || Haleakala || Pan-STARRS ||  || align=right | 2.2 km || 
|-id=762 bgcolor=#d6d6d6
| 593762 ||  || — || October 13, 2015 || Mount Lemmon || Mount Lemmon Survey ||  || align=right | 2.3 km || 
|-id=763 bgcolor=#d6d6d6
| 593763 ||  || — || October 10, 2004 || Kitt Peak || Spacewatch ||  || align=right | 2.6 km || 
|-id=764 bgcolor=#d6d6d6
| 593764 ||  || — || October 9, 2004 || Kitt Peak || Spacewatch ||  || align=right | 2.8 km || 
|-id=765 bgcolor=#d6d6d6
| 593765 ||  || — || July 1, 2014 || Haleakala || Pan-STARRS ||  || align=right | 3.5 km || 
|-id=766 bgcolor=#d6d6d6
| 593766 ||  || — || October 31, 2010 || Kitt Peak || Spacewatch ||  || align=right | 2.5 km || 
|-id=767 bgcolor=#d6d6d6
| 593767 ||  || — || April 13, 2013 || Haleakala || Pan-STARRS ||  || align=right | 2.7 km || 
|-id=768 bgcolor=#fefefe
| 593768 ||  || — || April 28, 2004 || Kitt Peak || Spacewatch ||  || align=right data-sort-value="0.63" | 630 m || 
|-id=769 bgcolor=#d6d6d6
| 593769 ||  || — || October 9, 2015 || ESA OGS || ESA OGS ||  || align=right | 3.0 km || 
|-id=770 bgcolor=#d6d6d6
| 593770 ||  || — || December 2, 2010 || Charleston || R. Holmes ||  || align=right | 3.0 km || 
|-id=771 bgcolor=#d6d6d6
| 593771 ||  || — || October 11, 2015 || Catalina || CSS ||  || align=right | 3.5 km || 
|-id=772 bgcolor=#d6d6d6
| 593772 ||  || — || April 7, 2008 || Kitt Peak || Spacewatch ||  || align=right | 3.0 km || 
|-id=773 bgcolor=#d6d6d6
| 593773 ||  || — || June 30, 2014 || Haleakala || Pan-STARRS ||  || align=right | 2.9 km || 
|-id=774 bgcolor=#d6d6d6
| 593774 ||  || — || September 28, 2009 || Kitt Peak || Spacewatch ||  || align=right | 3.0 km || 
|-id=775 bgcolor=#d6d6d6
| 593775 ||  || — || March 3, 2000 || Catalina || CSS ||  || align=right | 3.5 km || 
|-id=776 bgcolor=#d6d6d6
| 593776 ||  || — || September 19, 2003 || Palomar || NEAT ||  || align=right | 4.0 km || 
|-id=777 bgcolor=#d6d6d6
| 593777 ||  || — || May 8, 2008 || Mount Lemmon || Mount Lemmon Survey ||  || align=right | 3.2 km || 
|-id=778 bgcolor=#d6d6d6
| 593778 ||  || — || November 6, 2015 || Mount Lemmon || Mount Lemmon Survey ||  || align=right | 3.3 km || 
|-id=779 bgcolor=#d6d6d6
| 593779 ||  || — || November 14, 2015 || Mount Lemmon || Mount Lemmon Survey ||  || align=right | 3.3 km || 
|-id=780 bgcolor=#E9E9E9
| 593780 ||  || — || November 6, 2015 || Mount Lemmon || Mount Lemmon Survey ||  || align=right data-sort-value="0.91" | 910 m || 
|-id=781 bgcolor=#fefefe
| 593781 ||  || — || January 19, 2013 || Mount Lemmon || Mount Lemmon Survey ||  || align=right data-sort-value="0.50" | 500 m || 
|-id=782 bgcolor=#fefefe
| 593782 ||  || — || April 16, 2004 || Kitt Peak || Spacewatch ||  || align=right data-sort-value="0.80" | 800 m || 
|-id=783 bgcolor=#d6d6d6
| 593783 ||  || — || December 5, 2005 || Kitt Peak || Spacewatch ||  || align=right | 3.1 km || 
|-id=784 bgcolor=#E9E9E9
| 593784 ||  || — || June 5, 2014 || Haleakala || Pan-STARRS ||  || align=right | 1.3 km || 
|-id=785 bgcolor=#d6d6d6
| 593785 ||  || — || January 2, 2011 || Mount Lemmon || Mount Lemmon Survey ||  || align=right | 2.6 km || 
|-id=786 bgcolor=#d6d6d6
| 593786 ||  || — || September 21, 2009 || Kitt Peak || Spacewatch ||  || align=right | 2.2 km || 
|-id=787 bgcolor=#d6d6d6
| 593787 ||  || — || December 1, 2015 || Haleakala || Pan-STARRS || 7:4 || align=right | 2.7 km || 
|-id=788 bgcolor=#d6d6d6
| 593788 ||  || — || July 7, 2014 || Haleakala || Pan-STARRS || 7:4 || align=right | 3.2 km || 
|-id=789 bgcolor=#fefefe
| 593789 ||  || — || March 23, 2004 || Kitt Peak || Spacewatch ||  || align=right data-sort-value="0.54" | 540 m || 
|-id=790 bgcolor=#fefefe
| 593790 ||  || — || November 10, 2015 || Mount Lemmon || Mount Lemmon Survey ||  || align=right data-sort-value="0.53" | 530 m || 
|-id=791 bgcolor=#fefefe
| 593791 ||  || — || October 1, 2005 || Mount Lemmon || Mount Lemmon Survey ||  || align=right data-sort-value="0.62" | 620 m || 
|-id=792 bgcolor=#fefefe
| 593792 ||  || — || October 28, 2005 || Kitt Peak || Spacewatch ||  || align=right data-sort-value="0.50" | 500 m || 
|-id=793 bgcolor=#d6d6d6
| 593793 ||  || — || August 29, 2009 || Catalina || CSS ||  || align=right | 3.6 km || 
|-id=794 bgcolor=#fefefe
| 593794 ||  || — || April 11, 2003 || Kitt Peak || Spacewatch ||  || align=right data-sort-value="0.54" | 540 m || 
|-id=795 bgcolor=#E9E9E9
| 593795 ||  || — || December 6, 2015 || Mount Lemmon || Mount Lemmon Survey ||  || align=right | 1.0 km || 
|-id=796 bgcolor=#E9E9E9
| 593796 ||  || — || October 22, 2006 || Kitt Peak || Spacewatch ||  || align=right | 1.3 km || 
|-id=797 bgcolor=#d6d6d6
| 593797 ||  || — || July 25, 2015 || Haleakala || Pan-STARRS ||  || align=right | 3.3 km || 
|-id=798 bgcolor=#d6d6d6
| 593798 ||  || — || July 30, 2003 || Campo Imperatore || CINEOS ||  || align=right | 3.9 km || 
|-id=799 bgcolor=#fefefe
| 593799 ||  || — || December 8, 2015 || Mount Lemmon || Mount Lemmon Survey ||  || align=right data-sort-value="0.63" | 630 m || 
|-id=800 bgcolor=#fefefe
| 593800 ||  || — || October 10, 2005 || Uccle || P. De Cat ||  || align=right data-sort-value="0.62" | 620 m || 
|}

593801–593900 

|-bgcolor=#fefefe
| 593801 ||  || — || February 1, 2013 || Mount Lemmon || Mount Lemmon Survey ||  || align=right data-sort-value="0.61" | 610 m || 
|-id=802 bgcolor=#fefefe
| 593802 ||  || — || October 10, 2008 || Mount Lemmon || Mount Lemmon Survey ||  || align=right data-sort-value="0.59" | 590 m || 
|-id=803 bgcolor=#fefefe
| 593803 ||  || — || November 21, 2005 || Kitt Peak || Spacewatch ||  || align=right data-sort-value="0.70" | 700 m || 
|-id=804 bgcolor=#fefefe
| 593804 ||  || — || December 13, 2015 || Haleakala || Pan-STARRS ||  || align=right data-sort-value="0.72" | 720 m || 
|-id=805 bgcolor=#fefefe
| 593805 ||  || — || February 15, 2013 || Haleakala || Pan-STARRS ||  || align=right data-sort-value="0.63" | 630 m || 
|-id=806 bgcolor=#fefefe
| 593806 ||  || — || September 28, 2008 || Mount Lemmon || Mount Lemmon Survey ||  || align=right data-sort-value="0.62" | 620 m || 
|-id=807 bgcolor=#fefefe
| 593807 ||  || — || March 26, 2003 || Kitt Peak || Spacewatch ||  || align=right data-sort-value="0.49" | 490 m || 
|-id=808 bgcolor=#fefefe
| 593808 ||  || — || October 19, 2011 || Kitt Peak || Spacewatch ||  || align=right data-sort-value="0.83" | 830 m || 
|-id=809 bgcolor=#fefefe
| 593809 ||  || — || December 22, 2008 || Kitt Peak || Spacewatch ||  || align=right data-sort-value="0.72" | 720 m || 
|-id=810 bgcolor=#fefefe
| 593810 ||  || — || February 2, 2009 || Kitt Peak || Spacewatch ||  || align=right data-sort-value="0.58" | 580 m || 
|-id=811 bgcolor=#fefefe
| 593811 ||  || — || January 31, 2009 || Kitt Peak || Spacewatch ||  || align=right data-sort-value="0.62" | 620 m || 
|-id=812 bgcolor=#fefefe
| 593812 ||  || — || March 19, 2009 || Kitt Peak || Spacewatch ||  || align=right data-sort-value="0.68" | 680 m || 
|-id=813 bgcolor=#fefefe
| 593813 ||  || — || September 20, 2014 || Haleakala || Pan-STARRS ||  || align=right data-sort-value="0.65" | 650 m || 
|-id=814 bgcolor=#fefefe
| 593814 ||  || — || August 4, 2011 || Siding Spring || SSS ||  || align=right data-sort-value="0.77" | 770 m || 
|-id=815 bgcolor=#fefefe
| 593815 ||  || — || October 8, 2008 || Catalina || CSS ||  || align=right data-sort-value="0.61" | 610 m || 
|-id=816 bgcolor=#fefefe
| 593816 ||  || — || July 25, 2014 || Haleakala || Pan-STARRS ||  || align=right data-sort-value="0.57" | 570 m || 
|-id=817 bgcolor=#fefefe
| 593817 ||  || — || June 11, 2011 || Haleakala || Pan-STARRS ||  || align=right data-sort-value="0.73" | 730 m || 
|-id=818 bgcolor=#fefefe
| 593818 ||  || — || November 28, 2011 || Kitt Peak || Spacewatch ||  || align=right data-sort-value="0.76" | 760 m || 
|-id=819 bgcolor=#fefefe
| 593819 ||  || — || February 4, 2009 || Mount Lemmon || Mount Lemmon Survey ||  || align=right data-sort-value="0.74" | 740 m || 
|-id=820 bgcolor=#fefefe
| 593820 ||  || — || December 21, 2008 || Piszkesteto || K. Sárneczky ||  || align=right data-sort-value="0.87" | 870 m || 
|-id=821 bgcolor=#fefefe
| 593821 ||  || — || February 3, 2013 || Haleakala || Pan-STARRS ||  || align=right data-sort-value="0.58" | 580 m || 
|-id=822 bgcolor=#fefefe
| 593822 ||  || — || January 23, 2006 || Kitt Peak || Spacewatch ||  || align=right data-sort-value="0.58" | 580 m || 
|-id=823 bgcolor=#fefefe
| 593823 ||  || — || June 7, 2013 || Haleakala || Pan-STARRS ||  || align=right data-sort-value="0.68" | 680 m || 
|-id=824 bgcolor=#fefefe
| 593824 ||  || — || January 4, 2016 || Haleakala || Pan-STARRS ||  || align=right data-sort-value="0.81" | 810 m || 
|-id=825 bgcolor=#fefefe
| 593825 ||  || — || February 2, 2009 || Kitt Peak || Spacewatch ||  || align=right data-sort-value="0.66" | 660 m || 
|-id=826 bgcolor=#fefefe
| 593826 ||  || — || September 25, 2008 || Kitt Peak || Spacewatch ||  || align=right data-sort-value="0.55" | 550 m || 
|-id=827 bgcolor=#fefefe
| 593827 ||  || — || November 2, 2007 || Mount Lemmon || Mount Lemmon Survey ||  || align=right data-sort-value="0.68" | 680 m || 
|-id=828 bgcolor=#fefefe
| 593828 ||  || — || April 24, 2003 || Kitt Peak || Spacewatch ||  || align=right data-sort-value="0.77" | 770 m || 
|-id=829 bgcolor=#fefefe
| 593829 ||  || — || September 18, 2014 || Haleakala || Pan-STARRS ||  || align=right data-sort-value="0.59" | 590 m || 
|-id=830 bgcolor=#fefefe
| 593830 ||  || — || November 30, 2011 || Mount Lemmon || Mount Lemmon Survey ||  || align=right data-sort-value="0.68" | 680 m || 
|-id=831 bgcolor=#fefefe
| 593831 ||  || — || September 16, 2007 || Charleston || R. Holmes ||  || align=right data-sort-value="0.75" | 750 m || 
|-id=832 bgcolor=#fefefe
| 593832 ||  || — || January 14, 2012 || Mount Lemmon || Mount Lemmon Survey ||  || align=right data-sort-value="0.81" | 810 m || 
|-id=833 bgcolor=#fefefe
| 593833 ||  || — || April 18, 2009 || Kitt Peak || Spacewatch ||  || align=right data-sort-value="0.56" | 560 m || 
|-id=834 bgcolor=#fefefe
| 593834 ||  || — || January 8, 2016 || Haleakala || Pan-STARRS ||  || align=right data-sort-value="0.60" | 600 m || 
|-id=835 bgcolor=#fefefe
| 593835 ||  || — || August 22, 2014 || Haleakala || Pan-STARRS ||  || align=right data-sort-value="0.55" | 550 m || 
|-id=836 bgcolor=#fefefe
| 593836 ||  || — || January 8, 2016 || Haleakala || Pan-STARRS ||  || align=right data-sort-value="0.75" | 750 m || 
|-id=837 bgcolor=#fefefe
| 593837 ||  || — || July 25, 2014 || Haleakala || Pan-STARRS ||  || align=right data-sort-value="0.53" | 530 m || 
|-id=838 bgcolor=#fefefe
| 593838 ||  || — || December 16, 2004 || Kitt Peak || Spacewatch ||  || align=right data-sort-value="0.69" | 690 m || 
|-id=839 bgcolor=#fefefe
| 593839 ||  || — || January 9, 2016 || Haleakala || Pan-STARRS ||  || align=right data-sort-value="0.61" | 610 m || 
|-id=840 bgcolor=#fefefe
| 593840 ||  || — || October 24, 2011 || Haleakala || Pan-STARRS ||  || align=right data-sort-value="0.64" | 640 m || 
|-id=841 bgcolor=#fefefe
| 593841 ||  || — || November 30, 2011 || Kitt Peak || Spacewatch ||  || align=right data-sort-value="0.71" | 710 m || 
|-id=842 bgcolor=#fefefe
| 593842 ||  || — || July 8, 2014 || Haleakala || Pan-STARRS ||  || align=right data-sort-value="0.52" | 520 m || 
|-id=843 bgcolor=#fefefe
| 593843 ||  || — || August 23, 2003 || Palomar || NEAT || V || align=right data-sort-value="0.73" | 730 m || 
|-id=844 bgcolor=#fefefe
| 593844 ||  || — || January 7, 2016 || Haleakala || Pan-STARRS ||  || align=right data-sort-value="0.72" | 720 m || 
|-id=845 bgcolor=#fefefe
| 593845 ||  || — || June 7, 2013 || Haleakala || Pan-STARRS ||  || align=right data-sort-value="0.64" | 640 m || 
|-id=846 bgcolor=#fefefe
| 593846 ||  || — || January 7, 2016 || Haleakala || Pan-STARRS ||  || align=right data-sort-value="0.66" | 660 m || 
|-id=847 bgcolor=#fefefe
| 593847 ||  || — || February 20, 2006 || Mount Lemmon || Mount Lemmon Survey ||  || align=right data-sort-value="0.62" | 620 m || 
|-id=848 bgcolor=#fefefe
| 593848 ||  || — || January 12, 2016 || Haleakala || Pan-STARRS ||  || align=right data-sort-value="0.61" | 610 m || 
|-id=849 bgcolor=#fefefe
| 593849 ||  || — || September 9, 2007 || Kitt Peak || Spacewatch ||  || align=right data-sort-value="0.69" | 690 m || 
|-id=850 bgcolor=#fefefe
| 593850 ||  || — || September 20, 2014 || Haleakala || Pan-STARRS ||  || align=right data-sort-value="0.67" | 670 m || 
|-id=851 bgcolor=#fefefe
| 593851 ||  || — || February 19, 2009 || Mount Lemmon || Mount Lemmon Survey ||  || align=right data-sort-value="0.64" | 640 m || 
|-id=852 bgcolor=#fefefe
| 593852 ||  || — || January 20, 2009 || Mount Lemmon || Mount Lemmon Survey ||  || align=right data-sort-value="0.68" | 680 m || 
|-id=853 bgcolor=#fefefe
| 593853 ||  || — || January 3, 2016 || Haleakala || Pan-STARRS ||  || align=right data-sort-value="0.52" | 520 m || 
|-id=854 bgcolor=#fefefe
| 593854 ||  || — || January 4, 2016 || Haleakala || Pan-STARRS ||  || align=right data-sort-value="0.61" | 610 m || 
|-id=855 bgcolor=#fefefe
| 593855 ||  || — || February 20, 2009 || Kitt Peak || Spacewatch ||  || align=right data-sort-value="0.64" | 640 m || 
|-id=856 bgcolor=#fefefe
| 593856 ||  || — || November 3, 2011 || Mount Lemmon || Mount Lemmon Survey ||  || align=right data-sort-value="0.63" | 630 m || 
|-id=857 bgcolor=#fefefe
| 593857 ||  || — || November 9, 2007 || Kitt Peak || Spacewatch ||  || align=right data-sort-value="0.64" | 640 m || 
|-id=858 bgcolor=#fefefe
| 593858 ||  || — || January 15, 2016 || Haleakala || Pan-STARRS ||  || align=right data-sort-value="0.68" | 680 m || 
|-id=859 bgcolor=#fefefe
| 593859 ||  || — || June 4, 2013 || Mount Lemmon || Mount Lemmon Survey ||  || align=right data-sort-value="0.56" | 560 m || 
|-id=860 bgcolor=#fefefe
| 593860 ||  || — || January 11, 2016 || Haleakala || Pan-STARRS ||  || align=right data-sort-value="0.56" | 560 m || 
|-id=861 bgcolor=#fefefe
| 593861 ||  || — || January 14, 2016 || Haleakala || Pan-STARRS ||  || align=right data-sort-value="0.59" | 590 m || 
|-id=862 bgcolor=#fefefe
| 593862 ||  || — || February 4, 2006 || Mount Lemmon || Mount Lemmon Survey ||  || align=right data-sort-value="0.50" | 500 m || 
|-id=863 bgcolor=#E9E9E9
| 593863 ||  || — || January 14, 2016 || Haleakala || Pan-STARRS ||  || align=right | 1.7 km || 
|-id=864 bgcolor=#fefefe
| 593864 ||  || — || December 25, 2011 || Mount Lemmon || Mount Lemmon Survey ||  || align=right data-sort-value="0.68" | 680 m || 
|-id=865 bgcolor=#fefefe
| 593865 ||  || — || January 20, 2012 || Mount Lemmon || Mount Lemmon Survey ||  || align=right data-sort-value="0.62" | 620 m || 
|-id=866 bgcolor=#fefefe
| 593866 ||  || — || March 3, 2005 || Kitt Peak || Spacewatch ||  || align=right data-sort-value="0.62" | 620 m || 
|-id=867 bgcolor=#fefefe
| 593867 ||  || — || March 20, 2002 || Kitt Peak || Spacewatch ||  || align=right data-sort-value="0.54" | 540 m || 
|-id=868 bgcolor=#fefefe
| 593868 ||  || — || March 24, 2009 || Mount Lemmon || Mount Lemmon Survey ||  || align=right data-sort-value="0.55" | 550 m || 
|-id=869 bgcolor=#fefefe
| 593869 ||  || — || September 1, 2002 || Palomar || NEAT ||  || align=right data-sort-value="0.71" | 710 m || 
|-id=870 bgcolor=#fefefe
| 593870 ||  || — || April 4, 2005 || Catalina || CSS ||  || align=right data-sort-value="0.56" | 560 m || 
|-id=871 bgcolor=#fefefe
| 593871 ||  || — || February 5, 2009 || Kitt Peak || Spacewatch ||  || align=right data-sort-value="0.57" | 570 m || 
|-id=872 bgcolor=#fefefe
| 593872 ||  || — || March 17, 2005 || Kitt Peak || Spacewatch ||  || align=right data-sort-value="0.64" | 640 m || 
|-id=873 bgcolor=#fefefe
| 593873 ||  || — || January 16, 2005 || Kitt Peak || Spacewatch ||  || align=right data-sort-value="0.53" | 530 m || 
|-id=874 bgcolor=#fefefe
| 593874 ||  || — || December 28, 2005 || Kitt Peak || Spacewatch ||  || align=right data-sort-value="0.65" | 650 m || 
|-id=875 bgcolor=#d6d6d6
| 593875 ||  || — || July 14, 2013 || Haleakala || Pan-STARRS ||  || align=right | 3.1 km || 
|-id=876 bgcolor=#fefefe
| 593876 ||  || — || February 1, 2009 || Kitt Peak || Spacewatch ||  || align=right data-sort-value="0.52" | 520 m || 
|-id=877 bgcolor=#fefefe
| 593877 ||  || — || October 23, 2011 || Mount Lemmon || Mount Lemmon Survey ||  || align=right data-sort-value="0.51" | 510 m || 
|-id=878 bgcolor=#fefefe
| 593878 ||  || — || March 3, 2005 || Catalina || CSS ||  || align=right data-sort-value="0.71" | 710 m || 
|-id=879 bgcolor=#fefefe
| 593879 ||  || — || May 4, 2009 || Mount Lemmon || Mount Lemmon Survey ||  || align=right data-sort-value="0.60" | 600 m || 
|-id=880 bgcolor=#fefefe
| 593880 ||  || — || February 24, 2009 || Kitt Peak || Spacewatch ||  || align=right data-sort-value="0.67" | 670 m || 
|-id=881 bgcolor=#fefefe
| 593881 ||  || — || March 6, 2013 || Haleakala || Pan-STARRS ||  || align=right data-sort-value="0.61" | 610 m || 
|-id=882 bgcolor=#fefefe
| 593882 ||  || — || April 4, 2005 || Mount Lemmon || Mount Lemmon Survey ||  || align=right data-sort-value="0.59" | 590 m || 
|-id=883 bgcolor=#fefefe
| 593883 ||  || — || January 17, 2016 || Haleakala || Pan-STARRS ||  || align=right data-sort-value="0.59" | 590 m || 
|-id=884 bgcolor=#fefefe
| 593884 ||  || — || January 15, 2009 || Kitt Peak || Spacewatch ||  || align=right data-sort-value="0.54" | 540 m || 
|-id=885 bgcolor=#fefefe
| 593885 ||  || — || November 16, 2003 || Kitt Peak || Spacewatch ||  || align=right data-sort-value="0.73" | 730 m || 
|-id=886 bgcolor=#fefefe
| 593886 ||  || — || February 11, 2012 || Mount Lemmon || Mount Lemmon Survey ||  || align=right data-sort-value="0.57" | 570 m || 
|-id=887 bgcolor=#fefefe
| 593887 ||  || — || January 17, 2016 || Haleakala || Pan-STARRS ||  || align=right data-sort-value="0.76" | 760 m || 
|-id=888 bgcolor=#fefefe
| 593888 ||  || — || January 17, 2016 || Haleakala || Pan-STARRS ||  || align=right data-sort-value="0.66" | 660 m || 
|-id=889 bgcolor=#fefefe
| 593889 ||  || — || January 17, 2016 || Haleakala || Pan-STARRS ||  || align=right data-sort-value="0.56" | 560 m || 
|-id=890 bgcolor=#d6d6d6
| 593890 ||  || — || January 17, 2016 || Haleakala || Pan-STARRS || 7:4 || align=right | 3.5 km || 
|-id=891 bgcolor=#fefefe
| 593891 ||  || — || April 30, 2009 || Kitt Peak || Spacewatch ||  || align=right data-sort-value="0.59" | 590 m || 
|-id=892 bgcolor=#fefefe
| 593892 ||  || — || June 22, 2010 || Mount Lemmon || Mount Lemmon Survey ||  || align=right data-sort-value="0.77" | 770 m || 
|-id=893 bgcolor=#fefefe
| 593893 ||  || — || February 3, 2009 || Kitt Peak || Spacewatch ||  || align=right data-sort-value="0.76" | 760 m || 
|-id=894 bgcolor=#fefefe
| 593894 ||  || — || February 6, 2005 || Bergisch Gladbach || W. Bickel ||  || align=right data-sort-value="0.70" | 700 m || 
|-id=895 bgcolor=#fefefe
| 593895 ||  || — || January 15, 2016 || Haleakala || Pan-STARRS ||  || align=right data-sort-value="0.60" | 600 m || 
|-id=896 bgcolor=#fefefe
| 593896 ||  || — || April 9, 2005 || Kitt Peak || Spacewatch ||  || align=right data-sort-value="0.71" | 710 m || 
|-id=897 bgcolor=#fefefe
| 593897 ||  || — || February 3, 2009 || Mount Lemmon || Mount Lemmon Survey ||  || align=right data-sort-value="0.59" | 590 m || 
|-id=898 bgcolor=#fefefe
| 593898 ||  || — || February 1, 2016 || Haleakala || Pan-STARRS ||  || align=right data-sort-value="0.77" | 770 m || 
|-id=899 bgcolor=#fefefe
| 593899 ||  || — || September 19, 2014 || Haleakala || Pan-STARRS ||  || align=right data-sort-value="0.63" | 630 m || 
|-id=900 bgcolor=#fefefe
| 593900 ||  || — || April 16, 2009 || Siding Spring || SSS ||  || align=right data-sort-value="0.80" | 800 m || 
|}

593901–594000 

|-bgcolor=#fefefe
| 593901 ||  || — || October 27, 2011 || Mount Lemmon || Mount Lemmon Survey ||  || align=right data-sort-value="0.61" | 610 m || 
|-id=902 bgcolor=#fefefe
| 593902 ||  || — || February 27, 2009 || Mount Lemmon || Mount Lemmon Survey ||  || align=right | 1.2 km || 
|-id=903 bgcolor=#fefefe
| 593903 ||  || — || January 2, 2016 || Mount Lemmon || Mount Lemmon Survey ||  || align=right data-sort-value="0.51" | 510 m || 
|-id=904 bgcolor=#fefefe
| 593904 ||  || — || August 25, 2014 || Haleakala || Pan-STARRS ||  || align=right data-sort-value="0.71" | 710 m || 
|-id=905 bgcolor=#fefefe
| 593905 ||  || — || March 1, 2009 || Kitt Peak || Spacewatch ||  || align=right data-sort-value="0.71" | 710 m || 
|-id=906 bgcolor=#fefefe
| 593906 ||  || — || September 11, 2007 || Mount Lemmon || Mount Lemmon Survey ||  || align=right data-sort-value="0.60" | 600 m || 
|-id=907 bgcolor=#fefefe
| 593907 ||  || — || October 19, 2011 || Mount Lemmon || Mount Lemmon Survey ||  || align=right data-sort-value="0.74" | 740 m || 
|-id=908 bgcolor=#fefefe
| 593908 ||  || — || January 13, 2005 || Nogales || M. Ory ||  || align=right data-sort-value="0.75" | 750 m || 
|-id=909 bgcolor=#fefefe
| 593909 ||  || — || March 14, 2005 || Mount Lemmon || Mount Lemmon Survey ||  || align=right data-sort-value="0.72" | 720 m || 
|-id=910 bgcolor=#fefefe
| 593910 ||  || — || November 13, 2007 || Kitt Peak || Spacewatch ||  || align=right data-sort-value="0.70" | 700 m || 
|-id=911 bgcolor=#fefefe
| 593911 ||  || — || September 29, 2008 || Kitt Peak || Spacewatch ||  || align=right data-sort-value="0.51" | 510 m || 
|-id=912 bgcolor=#fefefe
| 593912 ||  || — || March 18, 2009 || Kitt Peak || Spacewatch ||  || align=right data-sort-value="0.73" | 730 m || 
|-id=913 bgcolor=#fefefe
| 593913 ||  || — || February 5, 2016 || Haleakala || Pan-STARRS ||  || align=right data-sort-value="0.65" | 650 m || 
|-id=914 bgcolor=#fefefe
| 593914 ||  || — || May 12, 2013 || Mount Lemmon || Mount Lemmon Survey ||  || align=right data-sort-value="0.62" | 620 m || 
|-id=915 bgcolor=#fefefe
| 593915 ||  || — || March 31, 2009 || Kitt Peak || Spacewatch ||  || align=right data-sort-value="0.71" | 710 m || 
|-id=916 bgcolor=#fefefe
| 593916 ||  || — || October 17, 2014 || Mount Lemmon || Mount Lemmon Survey ||  || align=right data-sort-value="0.63" | 630 m || 
|-id=917 bgcolor=#fefefe
| 593917 ||  || — || January 20, 2009 || Mount Lemmon || Mount Lemmon Survey ||  || align=right data-sort-value="0.50" | 500 m || 
|-id=918 bgcolor=#fefefe
| 593918 ||  || — || October 24, 2011 || Haleakala || Pan-STARRS ||  || align=right data-sort-value="0.49" | 490 m || 
|-id=919 bgcolor=#fefefe
| 593919 ||  || — || February 3, 2008 || Mount Lemmon || Mount Lemmon Survey ||  || align=right data-sort-value="0.70" | 700 m || 
|-id=920 bgcolor=#fefefe
| 593920 ||  || — || April 21, 2009 || Mount Lemmon || Mount Lemmon Survey ||  || align=right data-sort-value="0.58" | 580 m || 
|-id=921 bgcolor=#fefefe
| 593921 ||  || — || March 21, 2009 || Kitt Peak || Spacewatch ||  || align=right data-sort-value="0.72" | 720 m || 
|-id=922 bgcolor=#fefefe
| 593922 ||  || — || June 5, 2013 || Mount Lemmon || Mount Lemmon Survey ||  || align=right data-sort-value="0.64" | 640 m || 
|-id=923 bgcolor=#fefefe
| 593923 ||  || — || September 18, 2011 || Mount Lemmon || Mount Lemmon Survey ||  || align=right data-sort-value="0.54" | 540 m || 
|-id=924 bgcolor=#fefefe
| 593924 ||  || — || April 20, 2013 || Kitt Peak || Spacewatch ||  || align=right data-sort-value="0.56" | 560 m || 
|-id=925 bgcolor=#fefefe
| 593925 ||  || — || November 3, 2007 || Mount Lemmon || Mount Lemmon Survey ||  || align=right data-sort-value="0.58" | 580 m || 
|-id=926 bgcolor=#fefefe
| 593926 ||  || — || December 17, 2015 || Haleakala || Pan-STARRS ||  || align=right data-sort-value="0.56" | 560 m || 
|-id=927 bgcolor=#fefefe
| 593927 ||  || — || October 15, 2007 || Kitt Peak || Spacewatch ||  || align=right data-sort-value="0.71" | 710 m || 
|-id=928 bgcolor=#fefefe
| 593928 ||  || — || September 15, 2007 || Kitt Peak || Spacewatch ||  || align=right data-sort-value="0.68" | 680 m || 
|-id=929 bgcolor=#fefefe
| 593929 ||  || — || September 29, 2011 || Mount Lemmon || Mount Lemmon Survey ||  || align=right data-sort-value="0.50" | 500 m || 
|-id=930 bgcolor=#fefefe
| 593930 ||  || — || September 2, 2010 || Mount Lemmon || Mount Lemmon Survey ||  || align=right data-sort-value="0.61" | 610 m || 
|-id=931 bgcolor=#fefefe
| 593931 ||  || — || April 22, 2009 || Mount Lemmon || Mount Lemmon Survey ||  || align=right data-sort-value="0.54" | 540 m || 
|-id=932 bgcolor=#fefefe
| 593932 ||  || — || May 2, 2006 || Mount Lemmon || Mount Lemmon Survey ||  || align=right data-sort-value="0.74" | 740 m || 
|-id=933 bgcolor=#fefefe
| 593933 ||  || — || April 4, 2005 || Mount Lemmon || Mount Lemmon Survey ||  || align=right data-sort-value="0.67" | 670 m || 
|-id=934 bgcolor=#fefefe
| 593934 ||  || — || October 2, 2014 || Mount Lemmon || Mount Lemmon Survey ||  || align=right data-sort-value="0.55" | 550 m || 
|-id=935 bgcolor=#fefefe
| 593935 ||  || — || December 6, 2011 || Haleakala || Pan-STARRS ||  || align=right data-sort-value="0.69" | 690 m || 
|-id=936 bgcolor=#fefefe
| 593936 ||  || — || January 2, 2009 || Kitt Peak || Spacewatch ||  || align=right data-sort-value="0.55" | 550 m || 
|-id=937 bgcolor=#fefefe
| 593937 ||  || — || July 25, 2014 || ESA OGS || ESA OGS ||  || align=right data-sort-value="0.62" | 620 m || 
|-id=938 bgcolor=#fefefe
| 593938 ||  || — || February 28, 2009 || Kitt Peak || Spacewatch ||  || align=right data-sort-value="0.54" | 540 m || 
|-id=939 bgcolor=#fefefe
| 593939 ||  || — || July 31, 2014 || Haleakala || Pan-STARRS ||  || align=right data-sort-value="0.64" | 640 m || 
|-id=940 bgcolor=#fefefe
| 593940 ||  || — || February 9, 2016 || Haleakala || Pan-STARRS ||  || align=right data-sort-value="0.55" | 550 m || 
|-id=941 bgcolor=#fefefe
| 593941 ||  || — || February 22, 2009 || Kitt Peak || Spacewatch ||  || align=right data-sort-value="0.66" | 660 m || 
|-id=942 bgcolor=#fefefe
| 593942 ||  || — || November 18, 2011 || Mount Lemmon || Mount Lemmon Survey ||  || align=right data-sort-value="0.69" | 690 m || 
|-id=943 bgcolor=#fefefe
| 593943 ||  || — || September 6, 2007 || Siding Spring || SSS ||  || align=right data-sort-value="0.82" | 820 m || 
|-id=944 bgcolor=#fefefe
| 593944 ||  || — || September 29, 2003 || Kitt Peak || Spacewatch ||  || align=right data-sort-value="0.75" | 750 m || 
|-id=945 bgcolor=#fefefe
| 593945 ||  || — || January 1, 2012 || Mount Lemmon || Mount Lemmon Survey ||  || align=right data-sort-value="0.62" | 620 m || 
|-id=946 bgcolor=#fefefe
| 593946 ||  || — || October 20, 2007 || Mount Lemmon || Mount Lemmon Survey ||  || align=right data-sort-value="0.66" | 660 m || 
|-id=947 bgcolor=#fefefe
| 593947 ||  || — || May 4, 2009 || Mount Lemmon || Mount Lemmon Survey ||  || align=right data-sort-value="0.71" | 710 m || 
|-id=948 bgcolor=#fefefe
| 593948 ||  || — || March 8, 2005 || Kitt Peak || Spacewatch ||  || align=right data-sort-value="0.68" | 680 m || 
|-id=949 bgcolor=#fefefe
| 593949 ||  || — || October 7, 2007 || Mount Lemmon || Mount Lemmon Survey ||  || align=right data-sort-value="0.77" | 770 m || 
|-id=950 bgcolor=#fefefe
| 593950 ||  || — || January 31, 2016 || Haleakala || Pan-STARRS ||  || align=right data-sort-value="0.83" | 830 m || 
|-id=951 bgcolor=#fefefe
| 593951 ||  || — || February 8, 2008 || Kitt Peak || Spacewatch ||  || align=right data-sort-value="0.84" | 840 m || 
|-id=952 bgcolor=#E9E9E9
| 593952 ||  || — || May 13, 2008 || Siding Spring || SSS ||  || align=right | 1.2 km || 
|-id=953 bgcolor=#fefefe
| 593953 ||  || — || September 19, 2003 || Kitt Peak || Spacewatch ||  || align=right | 1.0 km || 
|-id=954 bgcolor=#fefefe
| 593954 ||  || — || January 2, 2012 || Mount Lemmon || Mount Lemmon Survey ||  || align=right data-sort-value="0.75" | 750 m || 
|-id=955 bgcolor=#fefefe
| 593955 ||  || — || February 5, 2016 || Haleakala || Pan-STARRS ||  || align=right data-sort-value="0.68" | 680 m || 
|-id=956 bgcolor=#E9E9E9
| 593956 ||  || — || February 5, 2016 || Haleakala || Pan-STARRS ||  || align=right data-sort-value="0.75" | 750 m || 
|-id=957 bgcolor=#fefefe
| 593957 ||  || — || March 11, 2005 || Mount Lemmon || Mount Lemmon Survey ||  || align=right data-sort-value="0.64" | 640 m || 
|-id=958 bgcolor=#fefefe
| 593958 ||  || — || September 18, 2010 || Mount Lemmon || Mount Lemmon Survey ||  || align=right data-sort-value="0.89" | 890 m || 
|-id=959 bgcolor=#fefefe
| 593959 ||  || — || October 26, 2011 || Haleakala || Pan-STARRS ||  || align=right data-sort-value="0.52" | 520 m || 
|-id=960 bgcolor=#fefefe
| 593960 ||  || — || March 31, 2009 || Mount Lemmon || Mount Lemmon Survey ||  || align=right data-sort-value="0.66" | 660 m || 
|-id=961 bgcolor=#fefefe
| 593961 ||  || — || February 7, 2008 || Kitt Peak || Spacewatch ||  || align=right data-sort-value="0.70" | 700 m || 
|-id=962 bgcolor=#fefefe
| 593962 ||  || — || September 29, 2003 || Kitt Peak || Spacewatch ||  || align=right data-sort-value="0.69" | 690 m || 
|-id=963 bgcolor=#fefefe
| 593963 ||  || — || February 4, 2016 || Haleakala || Pan-STARRS ||  || align=right data-sort-value="0.53" | 530 m || 
|-id=964 bgcolor=#fefefe
| 593964 ||  || — || May 20, 2005 || Mount Lemmon || Mount Lemmon Survey ||  || align=right data-sort-value="0.69" | 690 m || 
|-id=965 bgcolor=#fefefe
| 593965 ||  || — || October 24, 2011 || Haleakala || Pan-STARRS ||  || align=right data-sort-value="0.57" | 570 m || 
|-id=966 bgcolor=#fefefe
| 593966 ||  || — || January 20, 2012 || Mount Lemmon || Mount Lemmon Survey ||  || align=right data-sort-value="0.54" | 540 m || 
|-id=967 bgcolor=#fefefe
| 593967 ||  || — || December 29, 2011 || Mount Lemmon || Mount Lemmon Survey ||  || align=right data-sort-value="0.65" | 650 m || 
|-id=968 bgcolor=#E9E9E9
| 593968 ||  || — || February 12, 2016 || Haleakala || Pan-STARRS ||  || align=right data-sort-value="0.82" | 820 m || 
|-id=969 bgcolor=#E9E9E9
| 593969 ||  || — || February 5, 2016 || Haleakala || Pan-STARRS ||  || align=right data-sort-value="0.82" | 820 m || 
|-id=970 bgcolor=#fefefe
| 593970 ||  || — || February 3, 2016 || Haleakala || Pan-STARRS ||  || align=right data-sort-value="0.67" | 670 m || 
|-id=971 bgcolor=#fefefe
| 593971 ||  || — || February 11, 2016 || Haleakala || Pan-STARRS ||  || align=right data-sort-value="0.63" | 630 m || 
|-id=972 bgcolor=#fefefe
| 593972 ||  || — || February 11, 2016 || Haleakala || Pan-STARRS ||  || align=right data-sort-value="0.81" | 810 m || 
|-id=973 bgcolor=#fefefe
| 593973 ||  || — || February 10, 2016 || Haleakala || Pan-STARRS ||  || align=right data-sort-value="0.52" | 520 m || 
|-id=974 bgcolor=#E9E9E9
| 593974 ||  || — || February 5, 2016 || Haleakala || Pan-STARRS ||  || align=right data-sort-value="0.79" | 790 m || 
|-id=975 bgcolor=#fefefe
| 593975 ||  || — || February 9, 2016 || Haleakala || Pan-STARRS ||  || align=right data-sort-value="0.61" | 610 m || 
|-id=976 bgcolor=#fefefe
| 593976 ||  || — || February 4, 2016 || Haleakala || Pan-STARRS ||  || align=right data-sort-value="0.60" | 600 m || 
|-id=977 bgcolor=#E9E9E9
| 593977 ||  || — || February 8, 2011 || Mount Lemmon || Mount Lemmon Survey ||  || align=right | 1.7 km || 
|-id=978 bgcolor=#fefefe
| 593978 ||  || — || September 25, 2014 || Kitt Peak || Spacewatch ||  || align=right data-sort-value="0.71" | 710 m || 
|-id=979 bgcolor=#fefefe
| 593979 ||  || — || March 31, 2009 || Mount Lemmon || Mount Lemmon Survey ||  || align=right data-sort-value="0.60" | 600 m || 
|-id=980 bgcolor=#fefefe
| 593980 ||  || — || January 14, 2016 || Haleakala || Pan-STARRS ||  || align=right data-sort-value="0.66" | 660 m || 
|-id=981 bgcolor=#fefefe
| 593981 ||  || — || November 5, 2007 || Mount Lemmon || Mount Lemmon Survey ||  || align=right data-sort-value="0.67" | 670 m || 
|-id=982 bgcolor=#fefefe
| 593982 ||  || — || November 20, 2007 || Mount Lemmon || Mount Lemmon Survey ||  || align=right data-sort-value="0.81" | 810 m || 
|-id=983 bgcolor=#fefefe
| 593983 ||  || — || March 13, 2005 || Catalina || CSS ||  || align=right data-sort-value="0.69" | 690 m || 
|-id=984 bgcolor=#fefefe
| 593984 ||  || — || October 26, 2011 || Haleakala || Pan-STARRS ||  || align=right data-sort-value="0.73" | 730 m || 
|-id=985 bgcolor=#fefefe
| 593985 ||  || — || February 10, 2016 || Haleakala || Pan-STARRS ||  || align=right data-sort-value="0.56" | 560 m || 
|-id=986 bgcolor=#fefefe
| 593986 ||  || — || September 26, 2003 || Apache Point || SDSS Collaboration ||  || align=right data-sort-value="0.65" | 650 m || 
|-id=987 bgcolor=#fefefe
| 593987 ||  || — || February 4, 2016 || Haleakala || Pan-STARRS ||  || align=right data-sort-value="0.51" | 510 m || 
|-id=988 bgcolor=#fefefe
| 593988 ||  || — || February 5, 2016 || Haleakala || Pan-STARRS ||  || align=right data-sort-value="0.76" | 760 m || 
|-id=989 bgcolor=#fefefe
| 593989 ||  || — || October 15, 2007 || Kitt Peak || Spacewatch ||  || align=right data-sort-value="0.70" | 700 m || 
|-id=990 bgcolor=#fefefe
| 593990 ||  || — || February 1, 2009 || Kitt Peak || Spacewatch ||  || align=right data-sort-value="0.52" | 520 m || 
|-id=991 bgcolor=#fefefe
| 593991 ||  || — || July 14, 2013 || Haleakala || Pan-STARRS ||  || align=right data-sort-value="0.67" | 670 m || 
|-id=992 bgcolor=#fefefe
| 593992 ||  || — || September 2, 2014 || Haleakala || Pan-STARRS ||  || align=right data-sort-value="0.56" | 560 m || 
|-id=993 bgcolor=#fefefe
| 593993 ||  || — || February 27, 2016 || Mount Lemmon || Mount Lemmon Survey ||  || align=right data-sort-value="0.59" | 590 m || 
|-id=994 bgcolor=#fefefe
| 593994 ||  || — || March 16, 2005 || Mount Lemmon || Mount Lemmon Survey ||  || align=right data-sort-value="0.59" | 590 m || 
|-id=995 bgcolor=#fefefe
| 593995 ||  || — || May 29, 2009 || Mount Lemmon || Mount Lemmon Survey ||  || align=right data-sort-value="0.79" | 790 m || 
|-id=996 bgcolor=#fefefe
| 593996 ||  || — || October 11, 2010 || Catalina || CSS ||  || align=right | 1.0 km || 
|-id=997 bgcolor=#E9E9E9
| 593997 ||  || — || December 24, 2014 || Mount Lemmon || Mount Lemmon Survey ||  || align=right data-sort-value="0.98" | 980 m || 
|-id=998 bgcolor=#fefefe
| 593998 ||  || — || May 15, 2010 || Kitt Peak || Spacewatch ||  || align=right data-sort-value="0.89" | 890 m || 
|-id=999 bgcolor=#E9E9E9
| 593999 ||  || — || March 4, 2016 || Haleakala || Pan-STARRS ||  || align=right data-sort-value="0.84" | 840 m || 
|-id=000 bgcolor=#fefefe
| 594000 ||  || — || April 19, 2009 || Mount Lemmon || Mount Lemmon Survey ||  || align=right data-sort-value="0.74" | 740 m || 
|}

References

External links 
 Discovery Circumstances: Numbered Minor Planets (590001)–(595000) (IAU Minor Planet Center)

0593